This is a partial list of unnumbered minor planets for principal provisional designations assigned during 1–15 October 2002. Since this period yielded a high number of provisional discoveries, it is further split into several standalone pages. , a total of 567 bodies remain unnumbered for this period. Objects for this year are listed on the following pages: A–B · C · D–F · G–K · L–O · P · Qi · Qii · Ri · Rii · S · Ti · Tii · U–V and W–Y. Also see previous and next year.

T 

|- id="2002 TL320" bgcolor=#E9E9E9
| 0 ||  || MBA-M || 18.2 || data-sort-value="0.96" | 960 m || multiple || 2002–2020 || 23 Nov 2020 || 54 || align=left | Disc.: SDSSAlt.: 2020 TQ18 || 
|- id="2002 TM320" bgcolor=#fefefe
| 0 ||  || MBA-I || 18.69 || data-sort-value="0.54" | 540 m || multiple || 2002–2022 || 25 Jan 2022 || 37 || align=left | Disc.: SDSSAlt.: 2020 RZ43 || 
|- id="2002 TU320" bgcolor=#fefefe
| 0 ||  || MBA-I || 18.7 || data-sort-value="0.54" | 540 m || multiple || 2002–2020 || 10 Sep 2020 || 50 || align=left | Disc.: SDSSAlt.: 2013 SK54 || 
|- id="2002 TZ320" bgcolor=#d6d6d6
| 0 ||  || MBA-O || 17.1 || 2.1 km || multiple || 2002–2019 || 26 Nov 2019 || 44 || align=left | Disc.: SDSS || 
|- id="2002 TC321" bgcolor=#E9E9E9
| 0 ||  || MBA-M || 18.1 || 1.0 km || multiple || 2002–2020 || 24 Jan 2020 || 100 || align=left | Disc.: SDSSAlt.: 2019 TR9 || 
|- id="2002 TD321" bgcolor=#d6d6d6
| 0 ||  || MBA-O || 16.71 || 2.5 km || multiple || 2002–2021 || 14 May 2021 || 104 || align=left | Disc.: SDSS || 
|- id="2002 TU321" bgcolor=#d6d6d6
| 1 ||  || MBA-O || 17.6 || 1.7 km || multiple || 2002–2017 || 24 Aug 2017 || 38 || align=left | Disc.: SDSSAdded on 22 July 2020 || 
|- id="2002 TB322" bgcolor=#d6d6d6
| 0 ||  || MBA-O || 16.95 || 2.3 km || multiple || 2002–2021 || 09 Apr 2021 || 124 || align=left | Disc.: SDSS || 
|- id="2002 TD322" bgcolor=#E9E9E9
| 1 ||  || MBA-M || 18.55 || data-sort-value="0.58" | 580 m || multiple || 2002–2020 || 21 Jan 2020 || 19 || align=left | Disc.: SDSS || 
|- id="2002 TJ322" bgcolor=#d6d6d6
| 0 ||  || MBA-O || 16.15 || 3.3 km || multiple || 2002–2022 || 25 Jan 2022 || 183 || align=left | Disc.: SDSS || 
|- id="2002 TV322" bgcolor=#E9E9E9
| 0 ||  || MBA-M || 17.09 || 2.1 km || multiple || 2002–2022 || 21 Jan 2022 || 99 || align=left | Disc.: SDSS || 
|- id="2002 TX322" bgcolor=#E9E9E9
| 2 ||  || MBA-M || 18.7 || data-sort-value="0.76" | 760 m || multiple || 2002–2019 || 20 Sep 2019 || 29 || align=left | Disc.: SDSSAdded on 17 January 2021Alt.: 2002 TX357, 2015 VC194 || 
|- id="2002 TA323" bgcolor=#E9E9E9
| 0 ||  || MBA-M || 18.22 || 1.3 km || multiple || 2000–2020 || 13 Sep 2020 || 38 || align=left | Disc.: SDSSAdded on 17 January 2021 || 
|- id="2002 TN323" bgcolor=#fefefe
| 0 ||  || MBA-I || 18.1 || data-sort-value="0.71" | 710 m || multiple || 2002–2021 || 14 Jan 2021 || 79 || align=left | Disc.: SDSS || 
|- id="2002 TO323" bgcolor=#fefefe
| 3 ||  || MBA-I || 19.0 || data-sort-value="0.47" | 470 m || multiple || 2002–2017 || 16 Nov 2017 || 24 || align=left | Disc.: SDSS || 
|- id="2002 TR323" bgcolor=#fefefe
| 4 ||  || MBA-I || 19.03 || data-sort-value="0.39" | 470 m || multiple || 2002-2021 || 10 Apr 2021 || 18 || align=left | Disc.: SDSSAlt.: 2014 EJ200 || 
|- id="2002 TU323" bgcolor=#fefefe
| – ||  || MBA-I || 20.0 || data-sort-value="0.30" | 300 m || single || 6 days || 11 Oct 2002 || 6 || align=left | Disc.: SDSS || 
|- id="2002 TX323" bgcolor=#E9E9E9
| 0 ||  || MBA-M || 18.1 || 1.0 km || multiple || 2002–2019 || 02 Nov 2019 || 56 || align=left | Disc.: SDSS || 
|- id="2002 TA324" bgcolor=#d6d6d6
| 0 ||  || MBA-O || 17.9 || 1.5 km || multiple || 2002–2019 || 05 Nov 2019 || 40 || align=left | Disc.: SDSSAdded on 22 July 2020 || 
|- id="2002 TC324" bgcolor=#E9E9E9
| 0 ||  || MBA-M || 17.30 || 1.9 km || multiple || 2002–2021 || 01 Dec 2021 || 55 || align=left | Disc.: SDSS || 
|- id="2002 TG324" bgcolor=#fefefe
| 2 ||  || MBA-I || 18.9 || data-sort-value="0.49" | 490 m || multiple || 2001–2016 || 25 Oct 2016 || 24 || align=left | Disc.: SDSS || 
|- id="2002 TL324" bgcolor=#E9E9E9
| 2 ||  || MBA-M || 18.6 || data-sort-value="0.57" | 570 m || multiple || 2000–2014 || 23 Jun 2014 || 26 || align=left | Disc.: SDSSAlt.: 2006 QX66 || 
|- id="2002 TU324" bgcolor=#d6d6d6
| 0 ||  || MBA-O || 17.0 || 2.2 km || multiple || 2002–2021 || 17 Jan 2021 || 103 || align=left | Disc.: SDSSAlt.: 2008 UG113 || 
|- id="2002 TH325" bgcolor=#E9E9E9
| 0 ||  || MBA-M || 17.13 || 2.1 km || multiple || 2002–2022 || 10 Jan 2022 || 125 || align=left | Disc.: SDSSAlt.: 2011 SY236 || 
|- id="2002 TL325" bgcolor=#E9E9E9
| 0 ||  || MBA-M || 17.68 || 1.6 km || multiple || 2002–2021 || 08 Dec 2021 || 85 || align=left | Disc.: SDSS || 
|- id="2002 TT325" bgcolor=#E9E9E9
| 0 ||  || MBA-M || 18.1 || data-sort-value="0.71" | 710 m || multiple || 2002–2020 || 24 Jan 2020 || 72 || align=left | Disc.: SDSSAlt.: 2012 BQ154 || 
|- id="2002 TX325" bgcolor=#d6d6d6
| 0 ||  || MBA-O || 17.1 || 2.1 km || multiple || 2002–2021 || 08 May 2021 || 33 || align=left | Disc.: SDSSAdded on 17 June 2021 || 
|- id="2002 TB326" bgcolor=#E9E9E9
| 0 ||  || MBA-M || 17.3 || 1.9 km || multiple || 2002–2020 || 17 Oct 2020 || 126 || align=left | Disc.: SDSSAlt.: 2011 SC242, 2014 HQ57 || 
|- id="2002 TC326" bgcolor=#E9E9E9
| 0 ||  || MBA-M || 18.3 || data-sort-value="0.65" | 650 m || multiple || 2002–2019 || 17 Dec 2019 || 28 || align=left | Disc.: SDSSAlt.: 2006 QJ173 || 
|- id="2002 TL326" bgcolor=#fefefe
| 0 ||  || MBA-I || 19.00 || data-sort-value="0.47" | 470 m || multiple || 2002–2021 || 14 May 2021 || 39 || align=left | Disc.: SDSSAlt.: 2018 NX12 || 
|- id="2002 TO326" bgcolor=#E9E9E9
| 0 ||  || MBA-M || 17.31 || 1.9 km || multiple || 2002–2021 || 08 Dec 2021 || 72 || align=left | Disc.: SDSS || 
|- id="2002 TP326" bgcolor=#fefefe
| 2 ||  || MBA-I || 19.5 || data-sort-value="0.37" | 370 m || multiple || 2002–2017 || 10 Nov 2017 || 25 || align=left | Disc.: SDSSAdded on 11 May 2021Alt.: 2017 SV158 || 
|- id="2002 TU326" bgcolor=#fefefe
| 0 ||  || MBA-I || 17.0 || 1.2 km || multiple || 2002–2020 || 20 Dec 2020 || 284 || align=left | Disc.: SDSSAlt.: 2011 GH2 || 
|- id="2002 TX326" bgcolor=#E9E9E9
| 1 ||  || MBA-M || 18.76 || data-sort-value="0.53" | 530 m || multiple || 2002–2016 || 05 Feb 2016 || 22 || align=left | Disc.: SDSSAdded on 11 May 2021Alt.: 2016 BE16 || 
|- id="2002 TD327" bgcolor=#E9E9E9
| 0 ||  || MBA-M || 17.97 || 1.4 km || multiple || 2002–2022 || 27 Jan 2022 || 52 || align=left | Disc.: SDSSAdded on 17 January 2021 || 
|- id="2002 TE327" bgcolor=#E9E9E9
| 2 ||  || MBA-M || 18.1 || data-sort-value="0.71" | 710 m || multiple || 2002–2018 || 06 Oct 2018 || 54 || align=left | Disc.: SDSSAdded on 22 July 2020Alt.: 2004 DU69 || 
|- id="2002 TO327" bgcolor=#d6d6d6
| 0 ||  || MBA-O || 17.3 || 1.9 km || multiple || 2002–2018 || 04 Dec 2018 || 58 || align=left | Disc.: SDSS || 
|- id="2002 TU327" bgcolor=#d6d6d6
| 0 ||  || MBA-O || 16.55 || 2.7 km || multiple || 2002–2021 || 15 Apr 2021 || 85 || align=left | Disc.: SDSS || 
|- id="2002 TW327" bgcolor=#d6d6d6
| 3 ||  || MBA-O || 17.6 || 1.7 km || multiple || 2002–2018 || 11 Nov 2018 || 31 || align=left | Disc.: SDSS || 
|- id="2002 TZ327" bgcolor=#d6d6d6
| 0 ||  || MBA-O || 17.23 || 2.0 km || multiple || 2002–2021 || 17 Apr 2021 || 83 || align=left | Disc.: SDSSAlt.: 2015 DR140 || 
|- id="2002 TA328" bgcolor=#d6d6d6
| 0 ||  || MBA-O || 17.91 || 1.5 km || multiple || 2002–2021 || 12 Sep 2021 || 42 || align=left | Disc.: SDSSAdded on 29 January 2022 || 
|- id="2002 TB328" bgcolor=#E9E9E9
| 0 ||  || MBA-M || 18.0 || 1.1 km || multiple || 1998–2019 || 03 Oct 2019 || 56 || align=left | Disc.: SDSS || 
|- id="2002 TD328" bgcolor=#fefefe
| 0 ||  || MBA-I || 19.48 || data-sort-value="0.38" | 380 m || multiple || 2001–2021 || 08 Sep 2021 || 45 || align=left | Disc.: SDSS || 
|- id="2002 TG328" bgcolor=#E9E9E9
| 0 ||  || MBA-M || 17.90 || 1.5 km || multiple || 2002–2021 || 11 Nov 2021 || 70 || align=left | Disc.: SDSSAdded on 24 December 2021 || 
|- id="2002 TJ328" bgcolor=#E9E9E9
| 0 ||  || MBA-M || 17.6 || 1.7 km || multiple || 2002–2020 || 13 Sep 2020 || 69 || align=left | Disc.: SDSS || 
|- id="2002 TK328" bgcolor=#d6d6d6
| 0 ||  || HIL || 16.6 || 2.7 km || multiple || 2002–2019 || 02 Jan 2019 || 44 || align=left | Disc.: SDSSAdded on 21 August 2021Alt.: 2010 OK130, 2010 TJ35 || 
|- id="2002 TP328" bgcolor=#E9E9E9
| 0 ||  || MBA-M || 16.9 || 1.2 km || multiple || 2002–2021 || 15 Jun 2021 || 229 || align=left | Disc.: SDSSAlt.: 2014 QS371 || 
|- id="2002 TR328" bgcolor=#E9E9E9
| 1 ||  || MBA-M || 18.9 || data-sort-value="0.70" | 700 m || multiple || 2002–2019 || 28 Jul 2019 || 24 || align=left | Disc.: SDSSAdded on 21 August 2021Alt.: 2015 RX209 || 
|- id="2002 TU328" bgcolor=#E9E9E9
| 0 ||  || MBA-M || 18.1 || 1.0 km || multiple || 2002–2019 || 02 Nov 2019 || 46 || align=left | Disc.: SDSS || 
|- id="2002 TV328" bgcolor=#fefefe
| 0 ||  || MBA-I || 18.88 || data-sort-value="0.50" | 500 m || multiple || 2002–2021 || 11 Sep 2021 || 48 || align=left | Disc.: SDSSAlt.: 2006 VJ144 || 
|- id="2002 TW328" bgcolor=#fefefe
| 0 ||  || MBA-I || 18.07 || data-sort-value="0.72" | 720 m || multiple || 2001–2021 || 07 Nov 2021 || 67 || align=left | Disc.: SDSS || 
|- id="2002 TZ328" bgcolor=#fefefe
| 1 ||  || MBA-I || 19.3 || data-sort-value="0.41" | 410 m || multiple || 2002–2018 || 22 Jan 2018 || 38 || align=left | Disc.: SDSS || 
|- id="2002 TA329" bgcolor=#fefefe
| 0 ||  || MBA-I || 18.4 || data-sort-value="0.62" | 620 m || multiple || 2002–2021 || 08 Jun 2021 || 51 || align=left | Disc.: SDSS || 
|- id="2002 TF329" bgcolor=#d6d6d6
| 0 ||  || MBA-O || 16.9 || 2.3 km || multiple || 2002–2018 || 18 Oct 2018 || 55 || align=left | Disc.: SDSSAlt.: 2015 BS378 || 
|- id="2002 TK329" bgcolor=#fefefe
| – ||  || MBA-I || 19.9 || data-sort-value="0.31" | 310 m || single || 14 days || 10 Oct 2002 || 7 || align=left | Disc.: SDSS || 
|- id="2002 TO329" bgcolor=#d6d6d6
| 0 ||  || MBA-O || 17.20 || 2.0 km || multiple || 2002–2021 || 27 Oct 2021 || 47 || align=left | Disc.: SDSS || 
|- id="2002 TT329" bgcolor=#d6d6d6
| 0 ||  || MBA-O || 17.2 || 2.0 km || multiple || 2002–2018 || 17 Aug 2018 || 37 || align=left | Disc.: SDSS || 
|- id="2002 TU329" bgcolor=#d6d6d6
| 0 ||  || MBA-O || 17.87 || 1.5 km || multiple || 2002–2021 || 27 Oct 2021 || 37 || align=left | Disc.: SDSSAdded on 17 June 2021Alt.: 2007 UW153 || 
|- id="2002 TY329" bgcolor=#E9E9E9
| 0 ||  || MBA-M || 17.6 || 1.3 km || multiple || 2002–2021 || 18 Jan 2021 || 74 || align=left | Disc.: SDSS || 
|- id="2002 TA330" bgcolor=#fefefe
| 0 ||  || MBA-I || 19.0 || data-sort-value="0.47" | 470 m || multiple || 2002–2020 || 05 Dec 2020 || 30 || align=left | Disc.: SDSSAdded on 21 August 2021Alt.: 2020 VM22 || 
|- id="2002 TB330" bgcolor=#d6d6d6
| 1 ||  || MBA-O || 18.10 || 1.3 km || multiple || 2002–2021 || 03 Aug 2021 || 21 || align=left | Disc.: SDSS || 
|- id="2002 TG330" bgcolor=#fefefe
| 1 ||  || MBA-I || 18.6 || data-sort-value="0.57" | 570 m || multiple || 2002–2020 || 10 Dec 2020 || 33 || align=left | Disc.: SDSS || 
|- id="2002 TJ330" bgcolor=#E9E9E9
| 0 ||  || MBA-M || 17.4 || 1.4 km || multiple || 2002–2020 || 23 Oct 2020 || 70 || align=left | Disc.: SDSSAlt.: 2005 GC160 || 
|- id="2002 TN330" bgcolor=#E9E9E9
| 0 ||  || MBA-M || 17.49 || 1.8 km || multiple || 2001–2021 || 11 Nov 2021 || 104 || align=left | Disc.: SDSSAlt.: 2007 VH206 || 
|- id="2002 TP330" bgcolor=#d6d6d6
| 3 ||  || MBA-O || 18.1 || 1.3 km || multiple || 2002–2018 || 17 Nov 2018 || 36 || align=left | Disc.: SDSSAlt.: 2018 VB97 || 
|- id="2002 TS330" bgcolor=#d6d6d6
| 0 ||  || MBA-O || 17.1 || 2.1 km || multiple || 2002–2019 || 19 Nov 2019 || 40 || align=left | Disc.: SDSS || 
|- id="2002 TY330" bgcolor=#d6d6d6
| 0 ||  || MBA-O || 16.4 || 2.9 km || multiple || 2002–2021 || 12 Jun 2021 || 138 || align=left | Disc.: SDSSAlt.: 2007 RR248 || 
|- id="2002 TZ330" bgcolor=#fefefe
| 0 ||  || MBA-I || 19.6 || data-sort-value="0.36" | 360 m || multiple || 2002–2021 || 03 Oct 2021 || 36 || align=left | Disc.: SDSS || 
|- id="2002 TD331" bgcolor=#E9E9E9
| 0 ||  || MBA-M || 17.6 || data-sort-value="0.90" | 900 m || multiple || 2002–2020 || 24 Mar 2020 || 77 || align=left | Disc.: SDSSAlt.: 2014 SV30 || 
|- id="2002 TN331" bgcolor=#fefefe
| 3 ||  || MBA-I || 19.4 || data-sort-value="0.39" | 390 m || multiple || 2002–2018 || 07 Sep 2018 || 17 || align=left | Disc.: SDSS || 
|- id="2002 TU331" bgcolor=#d6d6d6
| 0 ||  || MBA-O || 16.63 || 2.6 km || multiple || 1999–2021 || 15 Apr 2021 || 153 || align=left | Disc.: SDSSAlt.: 2010 CY111, 2010 JD91, 2015 AD57, 2018 TQ7 || 
|- id="2002 TC332" bgcolor=#d6d6d6
| 0 ||  || MBA-O || 17.0 || 2.2 km || multiple || 2002–2019 || 19 Dec 2019 || 59 || align=left | Disc.: SDSS || 
|- id="2002 TH332" bgcolor=#d6d6d6
| 0 ||  || MBA-O || 16.7 || 2.5 km || multiple || 2002–2020 || 21 Jan 2020 || 60 || align=left | Disc.: SDSS || 
|- id="2002 TJ332" bgcolor=#E9E9E9
| 0 ||  || MBA-M || 17.36 || 1.9 km || multiple || 2002–2021 || 28 Nov 2021 || 157 || align=left | Disc.: SDSS || 
|- id="2002 TK332" bgcolor=#d6d6d6
| 0 ||  || MBA-O || 17.00 || 2.2 km || multiple || 2002–2021 || 13 May 2021 || 96 || align=left | Disc.: SDSS || 
|- id="2002 TL332" bgcolor=#d6d6d6
| 0 ||  || MBA-O || 16.46 || 2.8 km || multiple || 2002–2022 || 06 Jan 2022 || 139 || align=left | Disc.: SDSSAlt.: 2014 WL150 || 
|- id="2002 TR332" bgcolor=#fefefe
| 0 ||  || MBA-I || 18.9 || data-sort-value="0.49" | 490 m || multiple || 2002–2019 || 27 Oct 2019 || 50 || align=left | Disc.: SDSS || 
|- id="2002 TS332" bgcolor=#d6d6d6
| 0 ||  || MBA-O || 16.64 || 2.6 km || multiple || 2002–2021 || 11 May 2021 || 85 || align=left | Disc.: SDSSAlt.: 2010 KW67 || 
|- id="2002 TT332" bgcolor=#d6d6d6
| 0 ||  || MBA-O || 17.86 || 1.5 km || multiple || 2002–2021 || 09 Sep 2021 || 58 || align=left | Disc.: SDSSAdded on 11 May 2021Alt.: 2016 PW19, 2017 VV48 || 
|- id="2002 TM333" bgcolor=#fefefe
| 0 ||  || MBA-I || 18.7 || data-sort-value="0.54" | 540 m || multiple || 2002–2020 || 17 Oct 2020 || 115 || align=left | Disc.: SDSS || 
|- id="2002 TO333" bgcolor=#E9E9E9
| 3 ||  || MBA-M || 18.4 || data-sort-value="0.88" | 880 m || multiple || 2002–2019 || 02 Nov 2019 || 22 || align=left | Disc.: SDSSAdded on 22 July 2020 || 
|- id="2002 TU333" bgcolor=#fefefe
| 2 ||  || MBA-I || 19.32 || data-sort-value="0.41" | 410 m || multiple || 2002–2015 || 10 Aug 2015 || 33 || align=left | Disc.: SDSS || 
|- id="2002 TV333" bgcolor=#fefefe
| 0 ||  || MBA-I || 18.1 || data-sort-value="0.71" | 710 m || multiple || 2002–2020 || 06 Dec 2020 || 105 || align=left | Disc.: SDSSAlt.: 2011 DD13 || 
|- id="2002 TW333" bgcolor=#d6d6d6
| 0 ||  || MBA-O || 16.8 || 2.4 km || multiple || 2002–2021 || 12 Jan 2021 || 35 || align=left | Disc.: SDSSAlt.: 2019 NX32 || 
|- id="2002 TB334" bgcolor=#d6d6d6
| 0 ||  || MBA-O || 16.9 || 2.3 km || multiple || 2002–2021 || 09 Jan 2021 || 51 || align=left | Disc.: SDSS || 
|- id="2002 TJ334" bgcolor=#d6d6d6
| 1 ||  || MBA-O || 17.90 || 1.5 km || multiple || 2002–2021 || 08 Sep 2021 || 32 || align=left | Disc.: SDSSAdded on 22 July 2020 || 
|- id="2002 TL334" bgcolor=#fefefe
| – ||  || MBA-I || 19.9 || data-sort-value="0.31" | 310 m || single || 6 days || 11 Oct 2002 || 6 || align=left | Disc.: SDSS || 
|- id="2002 TQ334" bgcolor=#E9E9E9
| 1 ||  || MBA-M || 17.8 || data-sort-value="0.82" | 820 m || multiple || 2002–2019 || 17 Dec 2019 || 40 || align=left | Disc.: SDSS || 
|- id="2002 TW334" bgcolor=#E9E9E9
| 0 ||  || MBA-M || 17.9 || 1.1 km || multiple || 2002–2021 || 16 Jan 2021 || 55 || align=left | Disc.: SDSS || 
|- id="2002 TX334" bgcolor=#fefefe
| 2 ||  || MBA-I || 18.5 || data-sort-value="0.59" | 590 m || multiple || 1995–2021 || 06 Jan 2021 || 32 || align=left | Disc.: SDSS || 
|- id="2002 TZ334" bgcolor=#E9E9E9
| 0 ||  || MBA-M || 18.3 || data-sort-value="0.65" | 650 m || multiple || 2002–2019 || 28 Dec 2019 || 56 || align=left | Disc.: SDSSAlt.: 2019 SB45 || 
|- id="2002 TA335" bgcolor=#d6d6d6
| 2 ||  || MBA-O || 16.9 || 2.8 km || multiple || 2002–2018 || 10 Nov 2018 || 44 || align=left | Disc.: SDSSAlt.: 2010 OG6 || 
|- id="2002 TD335" bgcolor=#fefefe
| 0 ||  || MBA-I || 17.9 || data-sort-value="0.78" | 780 m || multiple || 1994–2021 || 05 Jan 2021 || 144 || align=left | Disc.: SDSSAlt.: 2012 PU24, 2019 PE11 || 
|- id="2002 TF335" bgcolor=#E9E9E9
| 0 ||  || MBA-M || 17.9 || 1.5 km || multiple || 2002–2020 || 10 Oct 2020 || 47 || align=left | Disc.: SDSS || 
|- id="2002 TM335" bgcolor=#E9E9E9
| 0 ||  || MBA-M || 18.5 || 1.1 km || multiple || 2002–2020 || 08 Sep 2020 || 58 || align=left | Disc.: SDSSAdded on 19 October 2020 || 
|- id="2002 TN335" bgcolor=#E9E9E9
| 0 ||  || MBA-M || 17.25 || 1.1 km || multiple || 2002–2021 || 08 May 2021 || 129 || align=left | Disc.: SDSS || 
|- id="2002 TO335" bgcolor=#E9E9E9
| 2 ||  || MBA-M || 18.6 || data-sort-value="0.80" | 800 m || multiple || 2002–2015 || 02 Nov 2015 || 30 || align=left | Disc.: SDSS || 
|- id="2002 TY335" bgcolor=#fefefe
| 3 ||  || MBA-I || 18.8 || data-sort-value="0.52" | 520 m || multiple || 2002–2017 || 28 Nov 2017 || 27 || align=left | Disc.: SDSS || 
|- id="2002 TZ335" bgcolor=#E9E9E9
| 0 ||  || MBA-M || 17.5 || 1.3 km || multiple || 2002–2020 || 11 Dec 2020 || 90 || align=left | Disc.: SDSSAlt.: 2007 YC89 || 
|- id="2002 TF336" bgcolor=#fefefe
| 0 ||  || MBA-I || 18.1 || data-sort-value="0.71" | 710 m || multiple || 2002–2020 || 14 Nov 2020 || 67 || align=left | Disc.: SDSS || 
|- id="2002 TJ336" bgcolor=#d6d6d6
| 0 ||  || MBA-O || 17.2 || 2.0 km || multiple || 2002–2021 || 15 Apr 2021 || 37 || align=left | Disc.: SDSSAdded on 5 November 2021 || 
|- id="2002 TK336" bgcolor=#d6d6d6
| 0 ||  || MBA-O || 16.3 || 3.1 km || multiple || 2002–2019 || 29 Nov 2019 || 154 || align=left | Disc.: SDSSAlt.: 2011 GZ29 || 
|- id="2002 TM336" bgcolor=#fefefe
| 0 ||  || MBA-I || 18.4 || data-sort-value="0.62" | 620 m || multiple || 2002–2020 || 06 Dec 2020 || 81 || align=left | Disc.: SDSSAdded on 17 January 2021 || 
|- id="2002 TP336" bgcolor=#fefefe
| 0 ||  || MBA-I || 19.8 || data-sort-value="0.33" | 330 m || multiple || 2002–2018 || 15 Sep 2018 || 35 || align=left | Disc.: SDSS || 
|- id="2002 TS336" bgcolor=#E9E9E9
| 3 ||  || MBA-M || 19.1 || data-sort-value="0.64" | 640 m || multiple || 2002–2019 || 03 Oct 2019 || 22 || align=left | Disc.: SDSSAdded on 17 June 2021 || 
|- id="2002 TV336" bgcolor=#E9E9E9
| 0 ||  || MBA-M || 17.31 || 1.9 km || multiple || 2002–2021 || 10 Nov 2021 || 78 || align=left | Disc.: SDSSAdded on 5 November 2021 || 
|- id="2002 TB337" bgcolor=#d6d6d6
| 0 ||  || MBA-O || 17.26 || 2.0 km || multiple || 2002–2021 || 18 Apr 2021 || 64 || align=left | Disc.: SDSS || 
|- id="2002 TD337" bgcolor=#E9E9E9
| 2 ||  || MBA-M || 18.4 || 1.2 km || multiple || 2002–2020 || 18 Oct 2020 || 20 || align=left | Disc.: SDSSAdded on 17 January 2021 || 
|- id="2002 TE337" bgcolor=#E9E9E9
| 0 ||  || MBA-M || 17.4 || data-sort-value="0.98" | 980 m || multiple || 2002–2020 || 20 Jan 2020 || 58 || align=left | Disc.: SDSSAdded on 22 July 2020 || 
|- id="2002 TK337" bgcolor=#d6d6d6
| 0 ||  || MBA-O || 16.6 || 2.7 km || multiple || 2002–2020 || 17 Dec 2020 || 72 || align=left | Disc.: SDSS || 
|- id="2002 TM337" bgcolor=#E9E9E9
| 0 ||  || MBA-M || 17.97 || 1.4 km || multiple || 2002–2021 || 27 Nov 2021 || 27 || align=left | Disc.: SDSSAdded on 19 October 2020 || 
|- id="2002 TN337" bgcolor=#fefefe
| 2 ||  || MBA-I || 19.7 || data-sort-value="0.34" | 340 m || multiple || 2002–2018 || 08 Aug 2018 || 22 || align=left | Disc.: SDSSAlt.: 2015 RJ232 || 
|- id="2002 TO337" bgcolor=#fefefe
| 0 ||  || MBA-I || 18.39 || data-sort-value="0.62" | 620 m || multiple || 2002–2021 || 01 Nov 2021 || 76 || align=left | Disc.: SDSS || 
|- id="2002 TY337" bgcolor=#E9E9E9
| 0 ||  || MBA-M || 17.55 || 1.7 km || multiple || 1996–2021 || 11 Nov 2021 || 85 || align=left | Disc.: SDSS || 
|- id="2002 TZ337" bgcolor=#fefefe
| 0 ||  || MBA-I || 17.63 || data-sort-value="0.89" | 890 m || multiple || 2002–2021 || 25 Nov 2021 || 153 || align=left | Disc.: SDSSAlt.: 2012 HE1 || 
|- id="2002 TB338" bgcolor=#fefefe
| 0 ||  || MBA-I || 18.69 || data-sort-value="0.54" | 540 m || multiple || 2002–2021 || 01 Nov 2021 || 94 || align=left | Disc.: SDSSAlt.: 2006 VQ120 || 
|- id="2002 TD338" bgcolor=#E9E9E9
| – ||  || MBA-M || 18.7 || 1.0 km || single || 6 days || 11 Oct 2002 || 6 || align=left | Disc.: SDSS || 
|- id="2002 TJ338" bgcolor=#E9E9E9
| – ||  || MBA-M || 18.6 || data-sort-value="0.57" | 570 m || single || 26 days || 31 Oct 2002 || 8 || align=left | Disc.: SDSS || 
|- id="2002 TR338" bgcolor=#fefefe
| 0 ||  || MBA-I || 18.48 || data-sort-value="0.60" | 600 m || multiple || 2002–2022 || 12 Jan 2022 || 68 || align=left | Disc.: SDSSAlt.: 2015 DH36 || 
|- id="2002 TT338" bgcolor=#E9E9E9
| – ||  || MBA-M || 18.8 || data-sort-value="0.52" | 520 m || single || 25 days || 30 Oct 2002 || 8 || align=left | Disc.: SDSS || 
|- id="2002 TU338" bgcolor=#E9E9E9
| 0 ||  || MBA-M || 18.89 || data-sort-value="0.70" | 700 m || multiple || 2002–2021 || 14 Apr 2021 || 51 || align=left | Disc.: SDSS || 
|- id="2002 TV338" bgcolor=#E9E9E9
| 1 ||  || MBA-M || 18.4 || data-sort-value="0.62" | 620 m || multiple || 1998–2016 || 04 Feb 2016 || 29 || align=left | Disc.: SDSS || 
|- id="2002 TX338" bgcolor=#E9E9E9
| 0 ||  || MBA-M || 17.2 || 1.5 km || multiple || 2002–2020 || 08 Dec 2020 || 49 || align=left | Disc.: SDSSAdded on 22 July 2020 || 
|- id="2002 TY338" bgcolor=#fefefe
| 1 ||  || MBA-I || 19.9 || data-sort-value="0.31" | 310 m || multiple || 2002–2018 || 17 Jun 2018 || 23 || align=left | Disc.: SDSS || 
|- id="2002 TC339" bgcolor=#E9E9E9
| 0 ||  || MBA-M || 18.39 || 1.2 km || multiple || 2002–2021 || 29 Nov 2021 || 43 || align=left | Disc.: SDSSAdded on 24 December 2021 || 
|- id="2002 TO339" bgcolor=#E9E9E9
| 0 ||  || MBA-M || 18.08 || 1.3 km || multiple || 2002–2021 || 09 Dec 2021 || 72 || align=left | Disc.: SDSSAdded on 5 November 2021 || 
|- id="2002 TR339" bgcolor=#fefefe
| 0 ||  || MBA-I || 18.1 || data-sort-value="0.71" | 710 m || multiple || 2002–2020 || 12 Dec 2020 || 64 || align=left | Disc.: SDSSAdded on 30 September 2021Alt.: 2009 QY66 || 
|- id="2002 TT339" bgcolor=#fefefe
| 0 ||  || MBA-I || 18.4 || data-sort-value="0.62" | 620 m || multiple || 2002–2021 || 10 Mar 2021 || 41 || align=left | Disc.: SDSS || 
|- id="2002 TX339" bgcolor=#E9E9E9
| 0 ||  || MBA-M || 18.2 || data-sort-value="0.96" | 960 m || multiple || 2002–2020 || 23 Dec 2020 || 40 || align=left | Disc.: SDSSAlt.: 2015 TN301 || 
|- id="2002 TY339" bgcolor=#E9E9E9
| 1 ||  || MBA-M || 17.9 || 1.1 km || multiple || 2002–2019 || 22 Oct 2019 || 61 || align=left | Disc.: SDSS || 
|- id="2002 TB340" bgcolor=#E9E9E9
| 1 ||  || MBA-M || 18.87 || data-sort-value="0.88" | 900 m || multiple || 2002-2021 || 12 Dec 2021 || 21 || align=left | Disc.: SDSS || 
|- id="2002 TD340" bgcolor=#d6d6d6
| 0 ||  || MBA-O || 16.46 || 2.8 km || multiple || 2002–2021 || 08 Apr 2021 || 123 || align=left | Disc.: SDSSAlt.: 2016 FW41 || 
|- id="2002 TF340" bgcolor=#E9E9E9
| 3 ||  || MBA-M || 18.0 || 1.4 km || multiple || 2002–2020 || 14 Sep 2020 || 27 || align=left | Disc.: SDSSAdded on 17 January 2021 || 
|- id="2002 TG340" bgcolor=#d6d6d6
| 0 ||  || MBA-O || 15.9 || 5.6 km || multiple || 2002–2021 || 18 Jan 2021 || 190 || align=left | Disc.: SDSSAlt.: 2010 JZ6 || 
|- id="2002 TJ340" bgcolor=#fefefe
| 2 ||  || MBA-I || 18.5 || data-sort-value="0.59" | 590 m || multiple || 2002–2020 || 17 Dec 2020 || 86 || align=left | Disc.: SDSSAlt.: 2013 WQ132 || 
|- id="2002 TL340" bgcolor=#fefefe
| – ||  || MBA-I || 19.2 || data-sort-value="0.43" | 430 m || single || 6 days || 11 Oct 2002 || 6 || align=left | Disc.: SDSS || 
|- id="2002 TM340" bgcolor=#E9E9E9
| 1 ||  || MBA-M || 17.8 || 1.2 km || multiple || 2002–2019 || 08 Aug 2019 || 31 || align=left | Disc.: SDSSAdded on 21 August 2021 || 
|- id="2002 TP340" bgcolor=#fefefe
| 0 ||  || MBA-I || 17.94 || data-sort-value="0.77" | 770 m || multiple || 2002–2021 || 03 Dec 2021 || 102 || align=left | Disc.: SDSS || 
|- id="2002 TR340" bgcolor=#E9E9E9
| 2 ||  || MBA-M || 18.0 || 1.1 km || multiple || 2002–2020 || 20 Oct 2020 || 24 || align=left | Disc.: SDSS || 
|- id="2002 TV340" bgcolor=#d6d6d6
| 0 ||  || MBA-O || 16.3 || 3.1 km || multiple || 2002–2019 || 24 Dec 2019 || 146 || align=left | Disc.: SDSS || 
|- id="2002 TW340" bgcolor=#fefefe
| 0 ||  || MBA-I || 18.36 || data-sort-value="0.63" | 630 m || multiple || 2002–2022 || 27 Jan 2022 || 54 || align=left | Disc.: SDSSAdded on 19 October 2020 || 
|- id="2002 TX340" bgcolor=#E9E9E9
| 0 ||  || MBA-M || 17.5 || 1.8 km || multiple || 2002–2020 || 16 Nov 2020 || 54 || align=left | Disc.: SDSSAlt.: 2009 DP104 || 
|- id="2002 TA341" bgcolor=#fefefe
| 0 ||  || MBA-I || 18.24 || data-sort-value="0.67" | 670 m || multiple || 2002–2021 || 02 Dec 2021 || 143 || align=left | Disc.: SDSS || 
|- id="2002 TB341" bgcolor=#E9E9E9
| 0 ||  || MBA-M || 17.0 || 2.2 km || multiple || 2001–2020 || 06 Dec 2020 || 143 || align=left | Disc.: SDSSAlt.: 2015 OL50 || 
|- id="2002 TC341" bgcolor=#fefefe
| 1 ||  || MBA-I || 18.5 || data-sort-value="0.59" | 590 m || multiple || 2002–2020 || 17 Sep 2020 || 69 || align=left | Disc.: SDSS || 
|- id="2002 TD341" bgcolor=#E9E9E9
| 0 ||  || MBA-M || 17.9 || 1.1 km || multiple || 2002–2019 || 25 Nov 2019 || 61 || align=left | Disc.: SDSS || 
|- id="2002 TF341" bgcolor=#d6d6d6
| 0 ||  || MBA-O || 16.79 || 2.4 km || multiple || 2002–2021 || 10 May 2021 || 92 || align=left | Disc.: SDSSAlt.: 2018 TW8 || 
|- id="2002 TO341" bgcolor=#E9E9E9
| 0 ||  || MBA-M || 17.84 || data-sort-value="0.80" | 800 m || multiple || 2002–2021 || 14 Apr 2021 || 96 || align=left | Disc.: SDSSAlt.: 2002 TX302 || 
|- id="2002 TP341" bgcolor=#fefefe
| 0 ||  || MBA-I || 19.04 || data-sort-value="0.46" | 460 m || multiple || 2002–2019 || 24 Oct 2019 || 36 || align=left | Disc.: SDSSAdded on 24 December 2021 || 
|- id="2002 TQ341" bgcolor=#E9E9E9
| 0 ||  || MBA-M || 17.93 || 1.1 km || multiple || 2002–2021 || 15 Apr 2021 || 60 || align=left | Disc.: SDSS || 
|- id="2002 TW341" bgcolor=#fefefe
| 0 ||  || MBA-I || 19.1 || data-sort-value="0.45" | 450 m || multiple || 2002–2020 || 20 Oct 2020 || 33 || align=left | Disc.: SDSS || 
|- id="2002 TB342" bgcolor=#fefefe
| 0 ||  || MBA-I || 17.75 || data-sort-value="0.84" | 840 m || multiple || 1996–2022 || 07 Jan 2022 || 235 || align=left | Disc.: SDSSAlt.: 2011 CZ66 || 
|- id="2002 TC342" bgcolor=#d6d6d6
| 0 ||  || MBA-O || 17.05 || 2.2 km || multiple || 2002–2021 || 06 Apr 2021 || 43 || align=left | Disc.: SDSS || 
|- id="2002 TD342" bgcolor=#E9E9E9
| 0 ||  || MBA-M || 18.0 || 1.4 km || multiple || 2002–2020 || 11 Sep 2020 || 57 || align=left | Disc.: SDSSAlt.: 2019 JP72 || 
|- id="2002 TE342" bgcolor=#fefefe
| 0 ||  || MBA-I || 18.5 || data-sort-value="0.59" | 590 m || multiple || 2002–2020 || 10 Dec 2020 || 46 || align=left | Disc.: SDSSAdded on 22 July 2020Alt.: 2008 FG127 || 
|- id="2002 TF342" bgcolor=#E9E9E9
| 0 ||  || MBA-M || 17.7 || 1.2 km || multiple || 2002–2019 || 28 Oct 2019 || 55 || align=left | Disc.: SDSS || 
|- id="2002 TG342" bgcolor=#fefefe
| 0 ||  || MBA-I || 18.52 || data-sort-value="0.59" | 590 m || multiple || 2002–2021 || 03 Dec 2021 || 93 || align=left | Disc.: SDSS || 
|- id="2002 TK342" bgcolor=#fefefe
| 0 ||  || MBA-I || 18.8 || data-sort-value="0.52" | 520 m || multiple || 1995–2020 || 12 Dec 2020 || 41 || align=left | Disc.: SDSS || 
|- id="2002 TX342" bgcolor=#E9E9E9
| 0 ||  || MBA-M || 16.9 || 1.8 km || multiple || 2002–2021 || 16 Jan 2021 || 170 || align=left | Disc.: SDSSAlt.: 2011 UY183 || 
|- id="2002 TC343" bgcolor=#E9E9E9
| 0 ||  || MBA-M || 17.3 || 1.9 km || multiple || 2002–2020 || 20 Dec 2020 || 98 || align=left | Disc.: SDSS || 
|- id="2002 TE343" bgcolor=#fefefe
| 0 ||  || MBA-I || 17.9 || data-sort-value="0.78" | 780 m || multiple || 2002–2021 || 09 Jun 2021 || 104 || align=left | Disc.: SDSS || 
|- id="2002 TH343" bgcolor=#E9E9E9
| 0 ||  || MBA-M || 17.6 || data-sort-value="0.90" | 900 m || multiple || 2002–2019 || 04 Dec 2019 || 46 || align=left | Disc.: SDSS || 
|- id="2002 TJ343" bgcolor=#d6d6d6
| 0 ||  || MBA-O || 16.37 || 3.0 km || multiple || 2002–2021 || 11 May 2021 || 155 || align=left | Disc.: SDSS || 
|- id="2002 TK343" bgcolor=#E9E9E9
| 0 ||  || MBA-M || 18.2 || data-sort-value="0.96" | 960 m || multiple || 2002–2019 || 19 Dec 2019 || 71 || align=left | Disc.: SDSS || 
|- id="2002 TL343" bgcolor=#E9E9E9
| 0 ||  || MBA-M || 17.5 || 1.8 km || multiple || 2002–2020 || 20 Oct 2020 || 78 || align=left | Disc.: SDSSAlt.: 2015 PP21 || 
|- id="2002 TN343" bgcolor=#fefefe
| 0 ||  || MBA-I || 18.2 || data-sort-value="0.68" | 680 m || multiple || 2002–2020 || 15 Oct 2020 || 103 || align=left | Disc.: SDSS || 
|- id="2002 TO343" bgcolor=#d6d6d6
| 0 ||  || MBA-O || 17.2 || 2.0 km || multiple || 2002–2019 || 03 Dec 2019 || 43 || align=left | Disc.: SDSSAdded on 22 July 2020 || 
|- id="2002 TR343" bgcolor=#E9E9E9
| 2 ||  || MBA-M || 18.2 || data-sort-value="0.96" | 960 m || multiple || 2002–2019 || 28 Nov 2019 || 51 || align=left | Disc.: SDSS || 
|- id="2002 TS343" bgcolor=#E9E9E9
| 1 ||  || MBA-M || 18.2 || data-sort-value="0.68" | 680 m || multiple || 2002–2018 || 21 Aug 2018 || 35 || align=left | Disc.: SDSS || 
|- id="2002 TT343" bgcolor=#d6d6d6
| 0 ||  || MBA-O || 16.73 || 2.5 km || multiple || 2002–2021 || 30 Jun 2021 || 127 || align=left | Disc.: SDSS || 
|- id="2002 TX343" bgcolor=#fefefe
| 0 ||  || MBA-I || 17.59 || data-sort-value="0.90" | 900 m || multiple || 2002–2022 || 27 Jan 2022 || 147 || align=left | Disc.: SDSS || 
|- id="2002 TA344" bgcolor=#fefefe
| 0 ||  || MBA-I || 18.6 || data-sort-value="0.57" | 570 m || multiple || 2002–2021 || 17 Jan 2021 || 78 || align=left | Disc.: SDSS || 
|- id="2002 TC344" bgcolor=#E9E9E9
| 1 ||  || MBA-M || 18.2 || data-sort-value="0.96" | 960 m || multiple || 2002–2019 || 25 Sep 2019 || 42 || align=left | Disc.: SDSSAlt.: 2016 AR2 || 
|- id="2002 TD344" bgcolor=#E9E9E9
| 0 ||  || MBA-M || 17.46 || data-sort-value="0.96" | 960 m || multiple || 2002–2021 || 03 May 2021 || 94 || align=left | Disc.: SDSS || 
|- id="2002 TM344" bgcolor=#E9E9E9
| 2 ||  || MBA-M || 18.6 || data-sort-value="0.80" | 800 m || multiple || 2002–2015 || 14 Aug 2015 || 25 || align=left | Disc.: SDSS || 
|- id="2002 TN344" bgcolor=#E9E9E9
| 0 ||  || MBA-M || 17.4 || 1.8 km || multiple || 2002–2017 || 23 Jan 2017 || 60 || align=left | Disc.: SDSS || 
|- id="2002 TP344" bgcolor=#d6d6d6
| 0 ||  || MBA-O || 16.81 || 2.4 km || multiple || 2002–2021 || 31 Mar 2021 || 68 || align=left | Disc.: SDSSAlt.: 2016 GX162 || 
|- id="2002 TR344" bgcolor=#d6d6d6
| 0 ||  || MBA-O || 16.7 || 2.5 km || multiple || 2002–2021 || 17 Jan 2021 || 62 || align=left | Disc.: SDSS || 
|- id="2002 TW344" bgcolor=#fefefe
| 1 ||  || MBA-I || 19.61 || data-sort-value="0.36" | 360 m || multiple || 2002–2019 || 29 Oct 2019 || 18 || align=left | Disc.: SDSSAdded on 24 December 2021 || 
|- id="2002 TE345" bgcolor=#fefefe
| 0 ||  || MBA-I || 19.0 || data-sort-value="0.47" | 470 m || multiple || 2002–2020 || 15 Dec 2020 || 30 || align=left | Disc.: SDSSAdded on 5 November 2021 || 
|- id="2002 TF345" bgcolor=#E9E9E9
| 0 ||  || MBA-M || 17.83 || 1.5 km || multiple || 2002–2022 || 26 Jan 2022 || 55 || align=left | Disc.: SDSS || 
|- id="2002 TJ345" bgcolor=#d6d6d6
| 0 ||  || MBA-O || 16.79 || 2.4 km || multiple || 2002–2021 || 14 Apr 2021 || 126 || align=left | Disc.: SDSS || 
|- id="2002 TL345" bgcolor=#E9E9E9
| 0 ||  || MBA-M || 17.22 || 2.0 km || multiple || 2002–2022 || 22 Jan 2022 || 124 || align=left | Disc.: SDSS || 
|- id="2002 TN345" bgcolor=#E9E9E9
| 0 ||  || MBA-M || 16.8 || 1.8 km || multiple || 2002–2021 || 04 Jan 2021 || 80 || align=left | Disc.: SDSS || 
|- id="2002 TO345" bgcolor=#FA8072
| – ||  || MCA || 20.1 || data-sort-value="0.53" | 530 m || single || 6 days || 11 Oct 2002 || 6 || align=left | Disc.: SDSS || 
|- id="2002 TP345" bgcolor=#d6d6d6
| 0 ||  || MBA-O || 16.3 || 3.1 km || multiple || 2002–2021 || 18 Jan 2021 || 70 || align=left | Disc.: SDSS || 
|- id="2002 TQ345" bgcolor=#fefefe
| 2 ||  || MBA-I || 19.84 || data-sort-value="0.33" | 330 m || multiple || 2002-2020 || 20 Oct 2020 || 21 || align=left | Disc.: SDSS || 
|- id="2002 TS345" bgcolor=#fefefe
| – ||  || MBA-I || 18.8 || data-sort-value="0.52" | 520 m || single || 10 days || 15 Oct 2002 || 7 || align=left | Disc.: SDSS || 
|- id="2002 TT345" bgcolor=#d6d6d6
| 0 ||  || MBA-O || 16.9 || 2.3 km || multiple || 2002–2021 || 07 Feb 2021 || 46 || align=left | Disc.: SDSSAdded on 17 January 2021Alt.: 2016 EQ99 || 
|- id="2002 TU345" bgcolor=#d6d6d6
| 0 ||  || MBA-O || 16.3 || 3.1 km || multiple || 2002–2021 || 22 Jan 2021 || 113 || align=left | Disc.: SDSS || 
|- id="2002 TV345" bgcolor=#d6d6d6
| 0 ||  || MBA-O || 16.8 || 2.4 km || multiple || 2002–2021 || 15 May 2021 || 90 || align=left | Disc.: SDSSAlt.: 2013 WW40 || 
|- id="2002 TX345" bgcolor=#E9E9E9
| 0 ||  || MBA-M || 17.1 || 1.6 km || multiple || 2001–2021 || 08 Jan 2021 || 122 || align=left | Disc.: SDSSAlt.: 2015 VO119 || 
|- id="2002 TD346" bgcolor=#fefefe
| 0 ||  || MBA-I || 17.9 || data-sort-value="0.78" | 780 m || multiple || 2002–2020 || 16 Nov 2020 || 82 || align=left | Disc.: SDSS || 
|- id="2002 TG346" bgcolor=#E9E9E9
| – ||  || MBA-M || 19.3 || data-sort-value="0.77" | 770 m || single || 25 days || 30 Oct 2002 || 8 || align=left | Disc.: SDSS || 
|- id="2002 TH346" bgcolor=#d6d6d6
| 1 ||  || MBA-O || 17.6 || 1.7 km || multiple || 2002–2018 || 03 Oct 2018 || 26 || align=left | Disc.: SDSS || 
|- id="2002 TL346" bgcolor=#fefefe
| 0 ||  || MBA-I || 17.7 || data-sort-value="0.86" | 860 m || multiple || 2002–2021 || 09 Jan 2021 || 133 || align=left | Disc.: SDSS || 
|- id="2002 TM346" bgcolor=#d6d6d6
| 0 ||  || MBA-O || 17.78 || 1.5 km || multiple || 2002–2019 || 27 Oct 2019 || 23 || align=left | Disc.: SDSSAdded on 24 December 2021 || 
|- id="2002 TN346" bgcolor=#fefefe
| 0 ||  || MBA-I || 18.2 || data-sort-value="0.68" | 680 m || multiple || 2000–2021 || 10 Jan 2021 || 100 || align=left | Disc.: SDSS || 
|- id="2002 TX346" bgcolor=#fefefe
| 0 ||  || MBA-I || 18.1 || data-sort-value="0.71" | 710 m || multiple || 2002–2019 || 24 Dec 2019 || 116 || align=left | Disc.: SDSS || 
|- id="2002 TA347" bgcolor=#fefefe
| 0 ||  || MBA-I || 18.15 || data-sort-value="0.70" | 700 m || multiple || 2002–2022 || 27 Jan 2022 || 81 || align=left | Disc.: SDSSAdded on 19 October 2020 || 
|- id="2002 TC347" bgcolor=#fefefe
| 0 ||  || MBA-I || 18.82 || data-sort-value="0.52" | 520 m || multiple || 2002-2021 || 18 Mar 2021 || 53 || align=left | Disc.: SDSS || 
|- id="2002 TD347" bgcolor=#E9E9E9
| 0 ||  || MBA-M || 17.59 || data-sort-value="0.90" | 900 m || multiple || 2002–2021 || 11 Apr 2021 || 89 || align=left | Disc.: SDSSAlt.: 2005 JG145 || 
|- id="2002 TS347" bgcolor=#E9E9E9
| 0 ||  || MBA-M || 17.61 || data-sort-value="0.89" | 890 m || multiple || 2002–2021 || 03 May 2021 || 82 || align=left | Disc.: SDSSAlt.: 2008 AS89, 2013 GO86 || 
|- id="2002 TY347" bgcolor=#E9E9E9
| 2 ||  || MBA-M || 18.0 || 1.4 km || multiple || 2002–2020 || 09 Oct 2020 || 55 || align=left | Disc.: SDSSAdded on 9 March 2021Alt.: 2020 PG38 || 
|- id="2002 TA348" bgcolor=#d6d6d6
| 0 ||  || MBA-O || 16.42 || 2.9 km || multiple || 2002–2021 || 17 Apr 2021 || 60 || align=left | Disc.: SDSS || 
|- id="2002 TC348" bgcolor=#d6d6d6
| 2 ||  || MBA-O || 17.3 || 1.9 km || multiple || 2002–2015 || 22 Jan 2015 || 22 || align=left | Disc.: SDSSAlt.: 2015 BQ105 || 
|- id="2002 TJ348" bgcolor=#E9E9E9
| 0 ||  || MBA-M || 17.6 || 1.3 km || multiple || 2002–2019 || 08 Nov 2019 || 32 || align=left | Disc.: SDSSAdded on 11 May 2021Alt.: 2018 GQ18 || 
|- id="2002 TN348" bgcolor=#d6d6d6
| 0 ||  || MBA-O || 17.34 || 1.9 km || multiple || 2002–2021 || 01 Oct 2021 || 96 || align=left | Disc.: SDSSAdded on 22 July 2020 || 
|- id="2002 TO348" bgcolor=#d6d6d6
| 1 ||  || MBA-O || 17.1 || 2.1 km || multiple || 2002–2020 || 26 Jan 2020 || 36 || align=left | Disc.: SDSS || 
|- id="2002 TP348" bgcolor=#d6d6d6
| 0 ||  || MBA-O || 16.59 || 2.7 km || multiple || 2002–2021 || 09 Apr 2021 || 59 || align=left | Disc.: SDSS || 
|- id="2002 TV348" bgcolor=#d6d6d6
| 0 ||  || MBA-O || 16.60 || 2.7 km || multiple || 2000–2021 || 30 May 2021 || 126 || align=left | Disc.: SDSS || 
|- id="2002 TY348" bgcolor=#d6d6d6
| 0 ||  || MBA-O || 16.18 || 3.2 km || multiple || 2002–2021 || 03 Dec 2021 || 153 || align=left | Disc.: SDSS || 
|- id="2002 TZ348" bgcolor=#E9E9E9
| 0 ||  || MBA-M || 17.36 || 1.9 km || multiple || 2002–2022 || 07 Jan 2022 || 87 || align=left | Disc.: SDSSAlt.: 2015 KQ9 || 
|- id="2002 TD349" bgcolor=#d6d6d6
| 3 ||  || MBA-O || 16.8 || 2.4 km || multiple || 2002–2021 || 14 Jun 2021 || 15 || align=left | Disc.: SDSSAdded on 21 August 2021Alt.: 2021 JJ50 || 
|- id="2002 TK349" bgcolor=#E9E9E9
| 1 ||  || MBA-M || 18.0 || 1.1 km || multiple || 2002–2019 || 21 Nov 2019 || 112 || align=left | Disc.: SDSS || 
|- id="2002 TS349" bgcolor=#d6d6d6
| 0 ||  || MBA-O || 16.46 || 2.8 km || multiple || 2002–2022 || 09 Jan 2022 || 79 || align=left | Disc.: SDSS || 
|- id="2002 TU349" bgcolor=#E9E9E9
| 0 ||  || MBA-M || 17.80 || data-sort-value="0.82" | 820 m || multiple || 2002–2021 || 13 Apr 2021 || 24 || align=left | Disc.: SDSSAdded on 24 December 2021 || 
|- id="2002 TV349" bgcolor=#E9E9E9
| 0 ||  || MBA-M || 18.41 || data-sort-value="0.87" | 870 m || multiple || 2002–2019 || 29 Oct 2019 || 36 || align=left | Disc.: SDSS || 
|- id="2002 TA350" bgcolor=#d6d6d6
| 0 ||  || MBA-O || 17.07 || 2.1 km || multiple || 2002–2021 || 30 Jul 2021 || 124 || align=left | Disc.: SDSS || 
|- id="2002 TC350" bgcolor=#d6d6d6
| 0 ||  || MBA-O || 15.49 || 4.4 km || multiple || 2002–2021 || 08 Oct 2021 || 140 || align=left | Disc.: SDSS || 
|- id="2002 TJ350" bgcolor=#d6d6d6
| 0 ||  || MBA-O || 16.50 || 2.8 km || multiple || 2002–2022 || 07 Jan 2022 || 118 || align=left | Disc.: SDSS || 
|- id="2002 TV350" bgcolor=#d6d6d6
| 0 ||  || MBA-O || 17.41 || 1.8 km || multiple || 2002–2018 || 29 Nov 2018 || 31 || align=left | Disc.: SDSSAdded on 17 June 2021Alt.: 2017 MJ6 || 
|- id="2002 TY350" bgcolor=#E9E9E9
| 0 ||  || MBA-M || 17.31 || 1.9 km || multiple || 2002–2022 || 07 Jan 2022 || 307 || align=left | Disc.: SDSS || 
|- id="2002 TK351" bgcolor=#d6d6d6
| 0 ||  || MBA-O || 17.23 || 2.0 km || multiple || 2002–2021 || 09 Apr 2021 || 46 || align=left | Disc.: SDSS || 
|- id="2002 TM351" bgcolor=#fefefe
| 0 ||  || MBA-I || 18.6 || data-sort-value="0.57" | 570 m || multiple || 2002–2020 || 14 Dec 2020 || 60 || align=left | Disc.: SDSSAdded on 17 January 2021 || 
|- id="2002 TT351" bgcolor=#C7FF8F
| 0 ||  || CEN || 13.38 || 12 km || multiple || 2002–2022 || 18 Oct 2022 || 263 || align=left | Disc.: SDSSAdded on 24 August 2020 || 
|- id="2002 TU351" bgcolor=#fefefe
| 3 ||  || MBA-I || 18.9 || data-sort-value="0.49" | 490 m || multiple || 2002–2016 || 08 Oct 2016 || 34 || align=left | Disc.: SDSS || 
|- id="2002 TW351" bgcolor=#d6d6d6
| 0 ||  || MBA-O || 16.9 || 2.3 km || multiple || 2002–2021 || 11 Jun 2021 || 60 || align=left | Disc.: SDSS || 
|- id="2002 TX351" bgcolor=#E9E9E9
| 0 ||  || MBA-M || 17.68 || 1.2 km || multiple || 2002–2022 || 06 Jan 2022 || 46 || align=left | Disc.: SDSS || 
|- id="2002 TY351" bgcolor=#d6d6d6
| 0 ||  || MBA-O || 16.61 || 2.7 km || multiple || 2002–2021 || 18 Apr 2021 || 103 || align=left | Disc.: SDSS || 
|- id="2002 TB352" bgcolor=#E9E9E9
| 1 ||  || MBA-M || 18.7 || data-sort-value="0.76" | 760 m || multiple || 2002–2020 || 10 Dec 2020 || 38 || align=left | Disc.: SDSS || 
|- id="2002 TD352" bgcolor=#E9E9E9
| 0 ||  || MBA-M || 17.7 || 1.6 km || multiple || 2002–2020 || 11 Oct 2020 || 66 || align=left | Disc.: SDSS || 
|- id="2002 TH352" bgcolor=#E9E9E9
| 0 ||  || MBA-M || 17.9 || 1.5 km || multiple || 2002–2020 || 12 Nov 2020 || 59 || align=left | Disc.: SDSS || 
|- id="2002 TV352" bgcolor=#d6d6d6
| 0 ||  || MBA-O || 17.00 || 2.2 km || multiple || 2002–2021 || 14 Apr 2021 || 50 || align=left | Disc.: SDSSAlt.: 2007 RA30 || 
|- id="2002 TG353" bgcolor=#fefefe
| 0 ||  || MBA-I || 18.4 || data-sort-value="0.62" | 620 m || multiple || 2002–2020 || 11 Dec 2020 || 92 || align=left | Disc.: SDSSAlt.: 2002 TZ317, 2013 YW22 || 
|- id="2002 TB354" bgcolor=#fefefe
| 0 ||  || MBA-I || 17.7 || data-sort-value="0.86" | 860 m || multiple || 2002–2020 || 17 Oct 2020 || 155 || align=left | Disc.: SDSSAlt.: 2015 BL213 || 
|- id="2002 TM354" bgcolor=#E9E9E9
| 0 ||  || MBA-M || 17.62 || 1.7 km || multiple || 2002–2021 || 09 Nov 2021 || 54 || align=left | Disc.: SDSSAdded on 5 November 2021 || 
|- id="2002 TV354" bgcolor=#fefefe
| 0 ||  || MBA-I || 18.4 || data-sort-value="0.62" | 620 m || multiple || 2002–2019 || 04 Jul 2019 || 46 || align=left | Disc.: SDSS || 
|- id="2002 TX354" bgcolor=#E9E9E9
| 0 ||  || MBA-M || 17.9 || data-sort-value="0.78" | 780 m || multiple || 1998–2019 || 31 Dec 2019 || 41 || align=left | Disc.: SDSSAlt.: 2014 NQ38 || 
|- id="2002 TR355" bgcolor=#E9E9E9
| 0 ||  || MBA-M || 17.81 || 1.5 km || multiple || 2002–2022 || 27 Jan 2022 || 76 || align=left | Disc.: SDSS || 
|- id="2002 TS355" bgcolor=#E9E9E9
| 0 ||  || MBA-M || 18.49 || 1.1 km || multiple || 2002–2020 || 16 Oct 2020 || 42 || align=left | Disc.: SDSSAdded on 19 October 2020 || 
|- id="2002 TA356" bgcolor=#fefefe
| 0 ||  || MBA-I || 18.48 || data-sort-value="0.60" | 600 m || multiple || 2002–2019 || 06 Sep 2019 || 84 || align=left | Disc.: SDSS || 
|- id="2002 TF356" bgcolor=#E9E9E9
| 0 ||  || MBA-M || 18.34 || 1.2 km || multiple || 2002–2020 || 08 Dec 2020 || 67 || align=left | Disc.: SDSS || 
|- id="2002 TG356" bgcolor=#E9E9E9
| 0 ||  || MBA-M || 17.46 || 1.8 km || multiple || 2002–2021 || 26 Nov 2021 || 91 || align=left | Disc.: SDSS || 
|- id="2002 TH356" bgcolor=#E9E9E9
| 0 ||  || MBA-M || 18.4 || data-sort-value="0.88" | 880 m || multiple || 2002–2019 || 03 Oct 2019 || 52 || align=left | Disc.: SDSS || 
|- id="2002 TK356" bgcolor=#E9E9E9
| 0 ||  || MBA-M || 17.14 || 2.1 km || multiple || 2002–2021 || 30 Nov 2021 || 148 || align=left | Disc.: SDSS || 
|- id="2002 TN356" bgcolor=#fefefe
| 2 ||  || MBA-I || 18.7 || data-sort-value="0.54" | 540 m || multiple || 2002–2020 || 14 Nov 2020 || 42 || align=left | Disc.: SDSSAlt.: 2020 RX30 || 
|- id="2002 TY356" bgcolor=#fefefe
| 0 ||  || MBA-I || 17.6 || data-sort-value="0.90" | 900 m || multiple || 2002–2018 || 12 Feb 2018 || 85 || align=left | Disc.: SDSS || 
|- id="2002 TD357" bgcolor=#fefefe
| 0 ||  || MBA-I || 18.8 || data-sort-value="0.52" | 520 m || multiple || 2002–2020 || 15 Oct 2020 || 39 || align=left | Disc.: SDSSAdded on 17 January 2021 || 
|- id="2002 TP357" bgcolor=#fefefe
| 0 ||  || MBA-I || 19.2 || data-sort-value="0.43" | 430 m || multiple || 2002–2019 || 25 Oct 2019 || 40 || align=left | Disc.: SDSSAdded on 21 August 2021Alt.: 2009 WX204, 2019 SC164 || 
|- id="2002 TZ357" bgcolor=#fefefe
| 2 ||  || MBA-I || 18.3 || data-sort-value="0.65" | 650 m || multiple || 2002–2020 || 16 Mar 2020 || 52 || align=left | Disc.: SDSSAdded on 22 July 2020Alt.: 2006 SH182 || 
|- id="2002 TA358" bgcolor=#d6d6d6
| 0 ||  || MBA-O || 17.7 || 1.6 km || multiple || 2002–2018 || 10 Oct 2018 || 39 || align=left | Disc.: SDSS || 
|- id="2002 TK358" bgcolor=#E9E9E9
| 1 ||  || MBA-M || 17.9 || data-sort-value="0.78" | 780 m || multiple || 2002–2017 || 18 Mar 2017 || 34 || align=left | Disc.: SDSS || 
|- id="2002 TL358" bgcolor=#d6d6d6
| 0 ||  || MBA-O || 17.31 || 1.9 km || multiple || 2002–2021 || 08 Sep 2021 || 93 || align=left | Disc.: SDSS || 
|- id="2002 TM358" bgcolor=#fefefe
| 0 ||  || MBA-I || 18.24 || data-sort-value="0.67" | 670 m || multiple || 2002–2021 || 02 Dec 2021 || 106 || align=left | Disc.: SDSS || 
|- id="2002 TO358" bgcolor=#d6d6d6
| 0 ||  || MBA-O || 17.69 || 1.6 km || multiple || 2002–2021 || 10 Aug 2021 || 58 || align=left | Disc.: SDSSAdded on 22 July 2020 || 
|- id="2002 TR358" bgcolor=#d6d6d6
| 3 ||  || MBA-O || 17.99 || 1.4 km || multiple || 2002–2018 || 30 Sep 2018 || 18 || align=left | Disc.: SDSS || 
|- id="2002 TV358" bgcolor=#E9E9E9
| – ||  || MBA-M || 18.9 || data-sort-value="0.49" | 490 m || single || 27 days || 11 Oct 2002 || 19 || align=left | Disc.: SDSS || 
|- id="2002 TW358" bgcolor=#E9E9E9
| 1 ||  || MBA-M || 18.0 || data-sort-value="0.75" | 750 m || multiple || 2002–2020 || 22 Mar 2020 || 93 || align=left | Disc.: SDSSAlt.: 2006 SD196, 2016 CL147 || 
|- id="2002 TK359" bgcolor=#fefefe
| 3 ||  || MBA-I || 19.2 || data-sort-value="0.43" | 430 m || multiple || 2002–2016 || 05 Nov 2016 || 36 || align=left | Disc.: SDSSAlt.: 2009 SP269 || 
|- id="2002 TL359" bgcolor=#d6d6d6
| – ||  || MBA-O || 18.7 || 1.0 km || single || 27 days || 11 Oct 2002 || 15 || align=left | Disc.: SDSS || 
|- id="2002 TO359" bgcolor=#d6d6d6
| 0 ||  || MBA-O || 17.37 || 1.9 km || multiple || 2002–2021 || 08 Sep 2021 || 115 || align=left | Disc.: SDSSAlt.: 2005 GB203 || 
|- id="2002 TS359" bgcolor=#E9E9E9
| 0 ||  || MBA-M || 18.68 || data-sort-value="0.77" | 770 m || multiple || 2002–2021 || 07 Jan 2021 || 25 || align=left | Disc.: SDSSAdded on 29 January 2022 || 
|- id="2002 TV359" bgcolor=#fefefe
| 0 ||  || MBA-I || 18.44 || data-sort-value="0.61" | 610 m || multiple || 2001–2021 || 02 Dec 2021 || 64 || align=left | Disc.: SDSSAlt.: 2017 WQ18 || 
|- id="2002 TX359" bgcolor=#E9E9E9
| 0 ||  || MBA-M || 17.13 || 1.6 km || multiple || 2002–2022 || 27 Jan 2022 || 106 || align=left | Disc.: SDSS || 
|- id="2002 TY359" bgcolor=#d6d6d6
| 0 ||  || MBA-O || 16.6 || 2.7 km || multiple || 2002–2020 || 16 Nov 2020 || 66 || align=left | Disc.: SDSSAlt.: 2019 LM11 || 
|- id="2002 TA360" bgcolor=#fefefe
| 0 ||  || MBA-I || 19.27 || data-sort-value="0.42" | 420 m || multiple || 2002–2021 || 13 Jul 2021 || 37 || align=left | Disc.: SDSS || 
|- id="2002 TL360" bgcolor=#E9E9E9
| 0 ||  || MBA-M || 17.5 || 1.3 km || multiple || 1998–2021 || 16 Jan 2021 || 98 || align=left | Disc.: SDSSAlt.: 2004 CY86 || 
|- id="2002 TN360" bgcolor=#E9E9E9
| 0 ||  || MBA-M || 18.2 || 1.3 km || multiple || 2002–2020 || 08 Nov 2020 || 49 || align=left | Disc.: SDSSAdded on 17 January 2021Alt.: 2011 SE127, 2011 SW276 || 
|- id="2002 TP360" bgcolor=#d6d6d6
| 0 ||  || MBA-O || 16.2 || 3.2 km || multiple || 1995–2021 || 07 Jan 2021 || 142 || align=left | Disc.: SDSSAlt.: 2010 GE41, 2011 FW80 || 
|- id="2002 TU360" bgcolor=#E9E9E9
| 1 ||  || MBA-M || 17.8 || data-sort-value="0.82" | 820 m || multiple || 2002–2016 || 06 Feb 2016 || 25 || align=left | Disc.: SDSS || 
|- id="2002 TY360" bgcolor=#E9E9E9
| 0 ||  || MBA-M || 17.7 || 1.6 km || multiple || 2002–2020 || 23 Sep 2020 || 63 || align=left | Disc.: SDSSAdded on 17 January 2021 || 
|- id="2002 TA361" bgcolor=#E9E9E9
| 0 ||  || MBA-M || 17.6 || 1.3 km || multiple || 2002–2019 || 02 Nov 2019 || 84 || align=left | Disc.: SDSSAlt.: 2014 NV5 || 
|- id="2002 TJ361" bgcolor=#fefefe
| 0 ||  || MBA-I || 18.5 || data-sort-value="0.59" | 590 m || multiple || 2002–2020 || 16 Oct 2020 || 104 || align=left | Disc.: SDSSAlt.: 2005 JV104 || 
|- id="2002 TL361" bgcolor=#d6d6d6
| 2 ||  || MBA-O || 17.5 || 1.8 km || multiple || 2002–2019 || 28 Nov 2019 || 25 || align=left | Disc.: SDSSAdded on 21 August 2021 || 
|- id="2002 TO361" bgcolor=#d6d6d6
| 0 ||  || MBA-O || 17.42 || 1.8 km || multiple || 2002–2021 || 10 Apr 2021 || 68 || align=left | Disc.: SDSSAlt.: 2015 DC53 || 
|- id="2002 TR361" bgcolor=#d6d6d6
| 0 ||  || MBA-O || 16.5 || 2.8 km || multiple || 2002–2020 || 20 Jan 2020 || 57 || align=left | Disc.: SDSS || 
|- id="2002 TW361" bgcolor=#E9E9E9
| 0 ||  || MBA-M || 18.3 || 1.2 km || multiple || 2002–2016 || 07 Nov 2016 || 32 || align=left | Disc.: SDSSAdded on 22 July 2020 || 
|- id="2002 TY361" bgcolor=#E9E9E9
| 0 ||  || MBA-M || 18.11 || 1.3 km || multiple || 2002–2021 || 30 Nov 2021 || 65 || align=left | Disc.: SDSS || 
|- id="2002 TZ361" bgcolor=#d6d6d6
| 0 ||  || MBA-O || 16.7 || 2.5 km || multiple || 2002–2021 || 07 Jan 2021 || 79 || align=left | Disc.: SDSSAlt.: 2016 EE60 || 
|- id="2002 TB362" bgcolor=#d6d6d6
| 0 ||  || MBA-O || 16.8 || 2.4 km || multiple || 2002–2019 || 02 Nov 2019 || 67 || align=left | Disc.: SDSS || 
|- id="2002 TD362" bgcolor=#fefefe
| 0 ||  || MBA-I || 19.1 || data-sort-value="0.45" | 450 m || multiple || 2002–2019 || 10 Jun 2019 || 21 || align=left | Disc.: SDSSAdded on 22 July 2020 || 
|- id="2002 TE362" bgcolor=#fefefe
| 2 ||  || MBA-I || 19.3 || data-sort-value="0.41" | 410 m || multiple || 2002–2014 || 13 Dec 2014 || 35 || align=left | Disc.: SDSSAlt.: 2006 UP169 || 
|- id="2002 TG362" bgcolor=#d6d6d6
| 0 ||  || MBA-O || 16.8 || 2.4 km || multiple || 2002–2021 || 11 Feb 2021 || 31 || align=left | Disc.: SDSSAdded on 21 August 2021 || 
|- id="2002 TH362" bgcolor=#d6d6d6
| 1 ||  || MBA-O || 17.4 || 1.8 km || multiple || 2002–2017 || 17 Aug 2017 || 26 || align=left | Disc.: SDSSAdded on 22 July 2020Alt.: 2007 TH401 || 
|- id="2002 TO362" bgcolor=#fefefe
| 0 ||  || MBA-I || 18.4 || data-sort-value="0.62" | 620 m || multiple || 2001–2020 || 14 Dec 2020 || 122 || align=left | Disc.: SDSS || 
|- id="2002 TT362" bgcolor=#d6d6d6
| 1 ||  || MBA-O || 18.4 || 1.2 km || multiple || 2002–2021 || 03 Oct 2021 || 22 || align=left | Disc.: SDSSAdded on 5 November 2021 || 
|- id="2002 TW362" bgcolor=#d6d6d6
| 0 ||  || MBA-O || 16.9 || 2.3 km || multiple || 2002–2019 || 29 Sep 2019 || 30 || align=left | Disc.: SDSSAdded on 22 July 2020Alt.: 2016 CH96 || 
|- id="2002 TB363" bgcolor=#fefefe
| 0 ||  || MBA-I || 18.75 || data-sort-value="0.53" | 530 m || multiple || 2002–2021 || 29 Nov 2021 || 64 || align=left | Disc.: SDSSAlt.: 2002 TB336 || 
|- id="2002 TD363" bgcolor=#E9E9E9
| 0 ||  || MBA-M || 17.70 || 1.6 km || multiple || 2002–2021 || 30 Nov 2021 || 46 || align=left | Disc.: SDSSAdded on 22 July 2020 || 
|- id="2002 TG363" bgcolor=#d6d6d6
| 0 ||  || MBA-O || 17.00 || 2.2 km || multiple || 2002–2021 || 09 Apr 2021 || 78 || align=left | Disc.: SDSS || 
|- id="2002 TC364" bgcolor=#fefefe
| 0 ||  || MBA-I || 18.6 || data-sort-value="0.57" | 570 m || multiple || 2002–2019 || 27 Nov 2019 || 100 || align=left | Disc.: SDSSAlt.: 2002 UV13, 2009 WU212 || 
|- id="2002 TG364" bgcolor=#fefefe
| 3 ||  || MBA-I || 18.9 || data-sort-value="0.49" | 490 m || multiple || 2002–2020 || 10 Oct 2020 || 27 || align=left | Disc.: SDSSAdded on 17 January 2021 || 
|- id="2002 TH364" bgcolor=#E9E9E9
| 0 ||  || MBA-M || 18.08 || data-sort-value="0.72" | 720 m || multiple || 2002–2021 || 08 May 2021 || 84 || align=left | Disc.: SDSS || 
|- id="2002 TJ364" bgcolor=#E9E9E9
| 2 ||  || MBA-M || 18.2 || data-sort-value="0.96" | 960 m || multiple || 2001–2019 || 04 Nov 2019 || 32 || align=left | Disc.: SDSS || 
|- id="2002 TL364" bgcolor=#E9E9E9
| 0 ||  || MBA-M || 17.5 || 1.3 km || multiple || 2002–2019 || 24 Oct 2019 || 137 || align=left | Disc.: SDSSAlt.: 2010 LK111, 2015 VR59 || 
|- id="2002 TM364" bgcolor=#fefefe
| 0 ||  || MBA-I || 18.68 || data-sort-value="0.55" | 550 m || multiple || 2002–2021 || 06 Nov 2021 || 70 || align=left | Disc.: SDSSAdded on 21 August 2021 || 
|- id="2002 TQ364" bgcolor=#d6d6d6
| 2 ||  || MBA-O || 17.6 || 1.7 km || multiple || 2002–2019 || 02 Nov 2019 || 36 || align=left | Disc.: SDSS || 
|- id="2002 TU364" bgcolor=#fefefe
| 0 ||  || MBA-I || 18.98 || data-sort-value="0.48" | 480 m || multiple || 2002–2021 || 09 May 2021 || 62 || align=left | Disc.: SDSSAlt.: 2015 RU121 || 
|- id="2002 TV364" bgcolor=#fefefe
| 1 ||  || MBA-I || 19.7 || data-sort-value="0.34" | 340 m || multiple || 2002–2019 || 24 Oct 2019 || 35 || align=left | Disc.: SDSS || 
|- id="2002 TZ364" bgcolor=#d6d6d6
| 0 ||  || MBA-O || 17.0 || 2.2 km || multiple || 2002–2019 || 05 Nov 2019 || 65 || align=left | Disc.: SDSSAlt.: 2017 FG144 || 
|- id="2002 TA365" bgcolor=#d6d6d6
| 0 ||  || MBA-O || 17.2 || 2.0 km || multiple || 2002–2017 || 21 Sep 2017 || 42 || align=left | Disc.: SDSS || 
|- id="2002 TD365" bgcolor=#d6d6d6
| 0 ||  || MBA-O || 17.0 || 2.2 km || multiple || 2002–2019 || 28 Nov 2019 || 58 || align=left | Disc.: SDSS || 
|- id="2002 TO365" bgcolor=#fefefe
| 0 ||  || MBA-I || 18.2 || data-sort-value="0.68" | 680 m || multiple || 2002–2021 || 18 Jan 2021 || 95 || align=left | Disc.: SDSSAlt.: 2013 YO88 || 
|- id="2002 TS365" bgcolor=#E9E9E9
| – ||  || MBA-M || 18.6 || data-sort-value="0.57" | 570 m || single || 20 days || 29 Oct 2002 || 13 || align=left | Disc.: SDSS || 
|- id="2002 TV365" bgcolor=#E9E9E9
| 0 ||  || MBA-M || 17.5 || 1.3 km || multiple || 2002–2021 || 05 Jan 2021 || 51 || align=left | Disc.: SDSS || 
|- id="2002 TX365" bgcolor=#E9E9E9
| 0 ||  || MBA-M || 18.8 || data-sort-value="0.73" | 730 m || multiple || 2002–2019 || 26 Nov 2019 || 48 || align=left | Disc.: SDSSAlt.: 2015 XD111 || 
|- id="2002 TY365" bgcolor=#d6d6d6
| 0 ||  || MBA-O || 17.38 || 1.9 km || multiple || 2002–2021 || 03 Aug 2021 || 85 || align=left | Disc.: SDSSAlt.: 2015 HX46 || 
|- id="2002 TC366" bgcolor=#fefefe
| 0 ||  || MBA-I || 18.2 || data-sort-value="0.68" | 680 m || multiple || 2002–2019 || 01 Nov 2019 || 94 || align=left | Disc.: SDSS || 
|- id="2002 TF366" bgcolor=#E9E9E9
| 0 ||  || MBA-M || 17.23 || 2.0 km || multiple || 2002–2021 || 29 Nov 2021 || 143 || align=left | Disc.: SDSS || 
|- id="2002 TG366" bgcolor=#E9E9E9
| 0 ||  || MBA-M || 17.70 || 1.6 km || multiple || 2002–2020 || 19 Oct 2020 || 77 || align=left | Disc.: SDSS || 
|- id="2002 TM366" bgcolor=#fefefe
| 0 ||  || MBA-I || 18.5 || data-sort-value="0.59" | 590 m || multiple || 2000–2021 || 15 Jan 2021 || 89 || align=left | Disc.: SDSSAdded on 17 January 2021 || 
|- id="2002 TO366" bgcolor=#fefefe
| 0 ||  || MBA-I || 17.86 || data-sort-value="0.80" | 800 m || multiple || 2002–2022 || 07 Jan 2022 || 174 || align=left | Disc.: SDSSAlt.: 2013 PE14 || 
|- id="2002 TP366" bgcolor=#E9E9E9
| 0 ||  || MBA-M || 18.04 || 1.4 km || multiple || 2002–2021 || 30 Nov 2021 || 53 || align=left | Disc.: SDSS || 
|- id="2002 TR366" bgcolor=#fefefe
| 2 ||  || MBA-I || 19.0 || data-sort-value="0.47" | 470 m || multiple || 2001–2019 || 10 Jan 2019 || 38 || align=left | Disc.: SDSSAlt.: 2010 XL10 || 
|- id="2002 TZ366" bgcolor=#d6d6d6
| 0 ||  || MBA-O || 16.60 || 2.7 km || multiple || 2002–2021 || 17 Apr 2021 || 94 || align=left | Disc.: SDSSAlt.: 2016 FT21 || 
|- id="2002 TC367" bgcolor=#d6d6d6
| 0 ||  || MBA-O || 16.6 || 2.7 km || multiple || 2002–2019 || 24 Dec 2019 || 82 || align=left | Disc.: SDSS || 
|- id="2002 TL367" bgcolor=#fefefe
| 3 ||  || MBA-I || 19.2 || data-sort-value="0.43" | 430 m || multiple || 2002–2013 || 12 Oct 2013 || 29 || align=left | Disc.: SDSSAlt.: 2013 RF118 || 
|- id="2002 TM367" bgcolor=#d6d6d6
| 0 ||  || MBA-O || 16.0 || 3.4 km || multiple || 2002.2022 || 21 May 2022 || 209 || align=left | Disc.: SDSSAlt.: 2011 FH32 || 
|- id="2002 TN367" bgcolor=#d6d6d6
| 0 ||  || MBA-O || 16.43 || 2.9 km || multiple || 2002–2021 || 29 Jul 2021 || 155 || align=left | Disc.: SDSSAlt.: 2010 GV34 || 
|- id="2002 TP367" bgcolor=#E9E9E9
| 0 ||  || MBA-M || 18.5 || data-sort-value="0.84" | 840 m || multiple || 2002–2019 || 02 Nov 2019 || 58 || align=left | Disc.: SDSSAlt.: 2012 BS83 || 
|- id="2002 TQ367" bgcolor=#E9E9E9
| 0 ||  || MBA-M || 17.44 || data-sort-value="0.97" | 970 m || multiple || 2002–2021 || 16 May 2021 || 106 || align=left | Disc.: SDSSAlt.: 2013 GJ89 || 
|- id="2002 TT367" bgcolor=#d6d6d6
| 0 ||  || MBA-O || 17.08 || 2.1 km || multiple || 2002–2021 || 10 Apr 2021 || 33 || align=left | Disc.: SDSSAdded on 24 December 2021 || 
|- id="2002 TW367" bgcolor=#E9E9E9
| 1 ||  || MBA-M || 18.4 || data-sort-value="0.62" | 620 m || multiple || 2002–2020 || 02 Feb 2020 || 31 || align=left | Disc.: SDSSAdded on 22 July 2020 || 
|- id="2002 TY367" bgcolor=#FA8072
| 1 ||  || MCA || 19.7 || data-sort-value="0.34" | 340 m || multiple || 2002–2020 || 17 Oct 2020 || 43 || align=left | Disc.: SDSS || 
|- id="2002 TZ367" bgcolor=#E9E9E9
| 0 ||  || MBA-M || 17.70 || data-sort-value="0.86" | 860 m || multiple || 2002–2021 || 03 Apr 2021 || 56 || align=left | Disc.: SDSSAdded on 22 July 2020Alt.: 2014 NL40 || 
|- id="2002 TF368" bgcolor=#d6d6d6
| 0 ||  || MBA-O || 16.6 || 2.7 km || multiple || 2002–2020 || 25 Dec 2020 || 55 || align=left | Disc.: SDSS || 
|- id="2002 TG368" bgcolor=#E9E9E9
| 0 ||  || MBA-M || 17.4 || 1.8 km || multiple || 2002–2020 || 10 Dec 2020 || 74 || align=left | Disc.: SDSSAlt.: 2006 SL235 || 
|- id="2002 TK368" bgcolor=#fefefe
| 0 ||  || MBA-I || 18.43 || data-sort-value="0.61" | 610 m || multiple || 2002–2021 || 05 Oct 2021 || 55 || align=left | Disc.: SDSS || 
|- id="2002 TN368" bgcolor=#E9E9E9
| 0 ||  || MBA-M || 17.56 || 1.7 km || multiple || 2002–2021 || 04 Jan 2021 || 124 || align=left | Disc.: SDSSAlt.: 2010 OV98, 2019 JC11 || 
|- id="2002 TO368" bgcolor=#E9E9E9
| – ||  || MBA-M || 19.0 || data-sort-value="0.67" | 670 m || single || 5 days || 15 Oct 2002 || 8 || align=left | Disc.: SDSS || 
|- id="2002 TR368" bgcolor=#E9E9E9
| 0 ||  || MBA-M || 18.4 || data-sort-value="0.88" | 880 m || multiple || 2002–2019 || 25 Sep 2019 || 76 || align=left | Disc.: SDSSAlt.: 2015 UY43 || 
|- id="2002 TS368" bgcolor=#d6d6d6
| 0 ||  || MBA-O || 16.8 || 2.4 km || multiple || 2002–2021 || 15 Jan 2021 || 47 || align=left | Disc.: SDSS || 
|- id="2002 TV368" bgcolor=#d6d6d6
| 0 ||  || MBA-O || 16.5 || 2.8 km || multiple || 2002–2021 || 17 Jan 2021 || 101 || align=left | Disc.: SDSS || 
|- id="2002 TW368" bgcolor=#fefefe
| – ||  || MBA-I || 20.3 || data-sort-value="0.26" | 260 m || single || 28 days || 07 Nov 2002 || 10 || align=left | Disc.: SDSS || 
|- id="2002 TA369" bgcolor=#fefefe
| 0 ||  || MBA-I || 17.94 || data-sort-value="0.77" | 770 m || multiple || 2002–2021 || 05 Dec 2021 || 132 || align=left | Disc.: SDSSAlt.: 2015 AY36 || 
|- id="2002 TD369" bgcolor=#E9E9E9
| 0 ||  || MBA-M || 16.64 || 2.6 km || multiple || 2002–2021 || 27 Dec 2021 || 244 || align=left | Disc.: SDSSAlt.: 2006 PH42, 2014 DA75 || 
|- id="2002 TL369" bgcolor=#fefefe
| 1 ||  || MBA-I || 18.4 || data-sort-value="0.62" | 620 m || multiple || 2002–2019 || 29 Jun 2019 || 32 || align=left | Disc.: SDSS || 
|- id="2002 TM369" bgcolor=#fefefe
| 0 ||  || MBA-I || 18.72 || data-sort-value="0.54" | 540 m || multiple || 2002–2021 || 31 May 2021 || 77 || align=left | Disc.: SDSS || 
|- id="2002 TP369" bgcolor=#d6d6d6
| 0 ||  || MBA-O || 16.9 || 2.3 km || multiple || 2002–2019 || 25 Oct 2019 || 37 || align=left | Disc.: SDSSAdded on 22 July 2020 || 
|- id="2002 TE370" bgcolor=#d6d6d6
| 0 ||  || MBA-O || 16.5 || 2.8 km || multiple || 2002–2020 || 19 Mar 2020 || 89 || align=left | Disc.: SDSS || 
|- id="2002 TG370" bgcolor=#E9E9E9
| 0 ||  || MBA-M || 17.1 || 1.6 km || multiple || 2002–2021 || 11 Jan 2021 || 74 || align=left | Disc.: SDSS || 
|- id="2002 TJ370" bgcolor=#fefefe
| 0 ||  || MBA-I || 18.08 || data-sort-value="0.72" | 720 m || multiple || 2002–2021 || 14 Nov 2021 || 88 || align=left | Disc.: SDSS || 
|- id="2002 TL370" bgcolor=#E9E9E9
| 0 ||  || MBA-M || 17.6 || 1.7 km || multiple || 2002–2020 || 16 Sep 2020 || 66 || align=left | Disc.: SDSSAlt.: 2016 UZ250 || 
|- id="2002 TM370" bgcolor=#fefefe
| – ||  || MBA-I || 18.4 || data-sort-value="0.62" | 620 m || single || 6 days || 11 Oct 2002 || 6 || align=left | Disc.: SDSS || 
|- id="2002 TS370" bgcolor=#d6d6d6
| 0 ||  || MBA-O || 16.6 || 2.7 km || multiple || 2002–2020 || 07 Jan 2020 || 81 || align=left | Disc.: SDSSAlt.: 2015 FP50 || 
|- id="2002 TZ370" bgcolor=#E9E9E9
| 0 ||  || MBA-M || 17.18 || 1.5 km || multiple || 2002–2021 || 15 Apr 2021 || 157 || align=left | Disc.: SDSSAlt.: 2015 TY119 || 
|- id="2002 TG371" bgcolor=#E9E9E9
| 0 ||  || MBA-M || 18.26 || 1.2 km || multiple || 2002–2021 || 07 Feb 2021 || 73 || align=left | Disc.: SDSSAlt.: 2015 PU79 || 
|- id="2002 TQ371" bgcolor=#E9E9E9
| 2 ||  || MBA-M || 18.8 || data-sort-value="0.73" | 730 m || multiple || 2002–2019 || 29 Nov 2019 || 27 || align=left | Disc.: SDSS || 
|- id="2002 TT371" bgcolor=#E9E9E9
| 2 ||  || MBA-M || 18.2 || data-sort-value="0.96" | 960 m || multiple || 2002–2019 || 28 Nov 2019 || 44 || align=left | Disc.: SDSS || 
|- id="2002 TW371" bgcolor=#d6d6d6
| 0 ||  || HIL || 15.6 || 4.2 km || multiple || 2001–2019 || 08 Jan 2019 || 129 || align=left | Disc.: SDSS || 
|- id="2002 TZ371" bgcolor=#E9E9E9
| 0 ||  || MBA-M || 17.0 || 1.7 km || multiple || 2002–2021 || 07 Jun 2021 || 132 || align=left | Disc.: SDSS || 
|- id="2002 TC372" bgcolor=#d6d6d6
| 0 ||  || MBA-O || 16.35 || 3.0 km || multiple || 2002–2021 || 07 Apr 2021 || 123 || align=left | Disc.: SDSS || 
|- id="2002 TA373" bgcolor=#E9E9E9
| 0 ||  || MBA-M || 17.83 || 1.5 km || multiple || 2002–2021 || 08 Dec 2021 || 68 || align=left | Disc.: SDSSAlt.: 2016 UB122 || 
|- id="2002 TZ373" bgcolor=#fefefe
| 0 ||  || MBA-I || 17.9 || data-sort-value="0.78" | 780 m || multiple || 2002–2020 || 15 Dec 2020 || 143 || align=left | Disc.: NEAT || 
|- id="2002 TH374" bgcolor=#E9E9E9
| 2 ||  || MBA-M || 17.9 || data-sort-value="0.78" | 780 m || multiple || 2002–2019 || 19 Dec 2019 || 45 || align=left | Disc.: NEAT || 
|- id="2002 TU374" bgcolor=#fefefe
| 0 ||  || MBA-I || 17.98 || data-sort-value="0.75" | 750 m || multiple || 2002–2021 || 03 Apr 2021 || 114 || align=left | Disc.: SDSS || 
|- id="2002 TX374" bgcolor=#E9E9E9
| 0 ||  || MBA-M || 17.56 || 1.7 km || multiple || 2002–2021 || 27 Nov 2021 || 44 || align=left | Disc.: SDSSAdded on 17 January 2021 || 
|- id="2002 TO376" bgcolor=#d6d6d6
| 0 ||  || MBA-O || 16.41 || 2.9 km || multiple || 2002–2021 || 18 Apr 2021 || 147 || align=left | Disc.: SDSS || 
|- id="2002 TT376" bgcolor=#E9E9E9
| 2 ||  || MBA-M || 17.5 || data-sort-value="0.94" | 940 m || multiple || 2002–2019 || 31 Dec 2019 || 24 || align=left | Disc.: NEAT || 
|- id="2002 TC377" bgcolor=#E9E9E9
| 0 ||  || MBA-M || 17.51 || data-sort-value="0.94" | 940 m || multiple || 2002–2021 || 14 Apr 2021 || 64 || align=left | Disc.: NEAT || 
|- id="2002 TE377" bgcolor=#FA8072
| 1 ||  || MCA || 19.6 || data-sort-value="0.36" | 360 m || multiple || 2002–2015 || 09 Jul 2015 || 41 || align=left | Disc.: SDSS || 
|- id="2002 TF377" bgcolor=#d6d6d6
| 0 ||  || MBA-O || 16.20 || 3.2 km || multiple || 1999–2021 || 03 May 2021 || 121 || align=left | Disc.: NEATAlt.: 2013 VG10 || 
|- id="2002 TK377" bgcolor=#E9E9E9
| 0 ||  || MBA-M || 17.24 || 2.0 km || multiple || 2002–2022 || 24 Jan 2022 || 135 || align=left | Disc.: NEATAlt.: 2011 ST253 || 
|- id="2002 TM377" bgcolor=#d6d6d6
| 0 ||  || MBA-O || 16.25 || 3.1 km || multiple || 2002–2021 || 03 May 2021 || 123 || align=left | Disc.: NEAT || 
|- id="2002 TP377" bgcolor=#E9E9E9
| 0 ||  || MBA-M || 17.7 || 1.2 km || multiple || 2002–2019 || 02 Nov 2019 || 81 || align=left | Disc.: NEAT || 
|- id="2002 TX377" bgcolor=#E9E9E9
| 0 ||  || MBA-M || 17.91 || data-sort-value="0.78" | 780 m || multiple || 2002–2021 || 12 Feb 2021 || 31 || align=left | Disc.: NEATAlt.: 2010 JL188 || 
|- id="2002 TY377" bgcolor=#fefefe
| 0 ||  || MBA-I || 17.61 || data-sort-value="0.89" | 890 m || multiple || 2002–2022 || 25 Jan 2022 || 236 || align=left | Disc.: NEATAlt.: 2011 BR13 || 
|- id="2002 TG378" bgcolor=#E9E9E9
| 1 ||  || MBA-M || 18.5 || data-sort-value="0.59" | 590 m || multiple || 2002–2020 || 24 Jan 2020 || 32 || align=left | Disc.: NEAT || 
|- id="2002 TN378" bgcolor=#fefefe
| 0 ||  || MBA-I || 18.2 || data-sort-value="0.68" | 680 m || multiple || 2002–2020 || 15 Dec 2020 || 119 || align=left | Disc.: NEAT || 
|- id="2002 TU378" bgcolor=#d6d6d6
| 0 ||  || MBA-O || 16.53 || 2.8 km || multiple || 2002–2021 || 03 May 2021 || 81 || align=left | Disc.: NEAT || 
|- id="2002 TC379" bgcolor=#E9E9E9
| 0 ||  || MBA-M || 17.9 || 1.1 km || multiple || 2002–2019 || 22 Oct 2019 || 42 || align=left | Disc.: NEATAlt.: 2015 TO251 || 
|- id="2002 TD379" bgcolor=#fefefe
| 0 ||  || MBA-I || 18.53 || data-sort-value="0.58" | 580 m || multiple || 2002–2021 || 02 Oct 2021 || 52 || align=left | Disc.: NEAT Added on 30 September 2021 || 
|- id="2002 TH379" bgcolor=#E9E9E9
| 0 ||  || MBA-M || 18.3 || data-sort-value="0.92" | 920 m || multiple || 2002–2019 || 01 Nov 2019 || 114 || align=left | Disc.: NEATAlt.: 2015 YK5 || 
|- id="2002 TM379" bgcolor=#fefefe
| – ||  || MBA-I || 19.2 || data-sort-value="0.43" | 430 m || single || 2 days || 06 Oct 2002 || 9 || align=left | Disc.: NEAT || 
|- id="2002 TO379" bgcolor=#fefefe
| 0 ||  || MBA-I || 18.7 || data-sort-value="0.54" | 540 m || multiple || 1995–2021 || 08 Jan 2021 || 99 || align=left | Disc.: NEATAlt.: 2014 AX36 || 
|- id="2002 TR379" bgcolor=#E9E9E9
| 0 ||  || MBA-M || 17.16 || 1.6 km || multiple || 2002–2021 || 08 Apr 2021 || 156 || align=left | Disc.: NEAT || 
|- id="2002 TV379" bgcolor=#fefefe
| 1 ||  || HUN || 19.2 || data-sort-value="0.43" | 430 m || multiple || 2002–2021 || 11 Nov 2021 || 57 || align=left | Disc.: NEAT || 
|- id="2002 TW379" bgcolor=#E9E9E9
| – ||  || MBA-M || 18.7 || 1.0 km || single || 10 days || 06 Oct 2002 || 9 || align=left | Disc.: NEAT || 
|- id="2002 TX379" bgcolor=#d6d6d6
| 3 ||  || MBA-O || 17.6 || 1.7 km || multiple || 2002–2013 || 08 Nov 2013 || 25 || align=left | Disc.: NEATAdded on 21 August 2021 || 
|- id="2002 TB380" bgcolor=#fefefe
| 0 ||  || MBA-I || 18.3 || data-sort-value="0.65" | 650 m || multiple || 2002–2019 || 25 Nov 2019 || 105 || align=left | Disc.: NEAT || 
|- id="2002 TE380" bgcolor=#d6d6d6
| – ||  || MBA-O || 18.1 || 1.3 km || single || 27 days || 11 Oct 2002 || 14 || align=left | Disc.: NEAT || 
|- id="2002 TF380" bgcolor=#E9E9E9
| 0 ||  || MBA-M || 17.8 || 1.2 km || multiple || 2002–2019 || 25 Sep 2019 || 71 || align=left | Disc.: NEAT || 
|- id="2002 TH380" bgcolor=#fefefe
| 3 ||  || MBA-I || 19.5 || data-sort-value="0.37" | 370 m || multiple || 2002–2012 || 13 Sep 2012 || 20 || align=left | Disc.: NEAT || 
|- id="2002 TJ380" bgcolor=#fefefe
| 0 ||  || MBA-I || 18.6 || data-sort-value="0.57" | 570 m || multiple || 2002–2021 || 06 Jan 2021 || 57 || align=left | Disc.: NEAT || 
|- id="2002 TK380" bgcolor=#fefefe
| 0 ||  || MBA-I || 17.9 || data-sort-value="0.78" | 780 m || multiple || 2002–2021 || 09 Jan 2021 || 132 || align=left | Disc.: NEATAlt.: 2011 FH91 || 
|- id="2002 TL380" bgcolor=#fefefe
| 0 ||  || MBA-I || 18.1 || data-sort-value="0.71" | 710 m || multiple || 2002–2020 || 23 Aug 2020 || 97 || align=left | Disc.: NEATAlt.: 2006 WA34, 2008 GR33 || 
|- id="2002 TR380" bgcolor=#fefefe
| 0 ||  || MBA-I || 18.9 || data-sort-value="0.49" | 490 m || multiple || 2002–2019 || 30 Nov 2019 || 82 || align=left | Disc.: NEATAlt.: 2009 WO161 || 
|- id="2002 TY380" bgcolor=#d6d6d6
| 0 ||  || MBA-O || 16.50 || 2.8 km || multiple || 2002–2021 || 18 May 2021 || 114 || align=left | Disc.: NEATAlt.: 2013 RG118 || 
|- id="2002 TA381" bgcolor=#d6d6d6
| 0 ||  || MBA-O || 17.07 || 2.1 km || multiple || 2002–2021 || 06 Apr 2021 || 54 || align=left | Disc.: NEAT || 
|- id="2002 TC381" bgcolor=#E9E9E9
| 2 ||  || MBA-M || 18.5 || data-sort-value="0.84" | 840 m || multiple || 2002–2019 || 24 Sep 2019 || 21 || align=left | Disc.: NEAT || 
|- id="2002 TD381" bgcolor=#E9E9E9
| 0 ||  || MBA-M || 18.1 || 1.0 km || multiple || 2002–2019 || 29 Sep 2019 || 71 || align=left | Disc.: NEAT || 
|- id="2002 TN381" bgcolor=#E9E9E9
| 0 ||  || MBA-M || 17.74 || 1.6 km || multiple || 2002–2021 || 26 Nov 2021 || 42 || align=left | Disc.: NEATAlt.: 2014 EV113, 2016 UD63 || 
|- id="2002 TS381" bgcolor=#E9E9E9
| 1 ||  || MBA-M || 18.2 || data-sort-value="0.68" | 680 m || multiple || 2002–2020 || 24 Jan 2020 || 86 || align=left | Disc.: NEATAlt.: 2014 QK176 || 
|- id="2002 TT381" bgcolor=#E9E9E9
| 0 ||  || MBA-M || 17.20 || 2.0 km || multiple || 2002–2021 || 10 Nov 2021 || 101 || align=left | Disc.: NEAT || 
|- id="2002 TU381" bgcolor=#d6d6d6
| 0 ||  || MBA-O || 16.22 || 3.2 km || multiple || 2002–2022 || 27 Jan 2022 || 113 || align=left | Disc.: NEAT || 
|- id="2002 TZ381" bgcolor=#fefefe
| 1 ||  || MBA-I || 18.8 || data-sort-value="0.52" | 520 m || multiple || 1995–2020 || 07 Dec 2020 || 44 || align=left | Disc.: SDSS || 
|- id="2002 TE382" bgcolor=#E9E9E9
| 0 ||  || MBA-M || 18.3 || data-sort-value="0.92" | 920 m || multiple || 2002–2019 || 02 Oct 2019 || 32 || align=left | Disc.: SDSSAdded on 22 July 2020Alt.: 2015 TK204 || 
|- id="2002 TP382" bgcolor=#fefefe
| 0 ||  || MBA-I || 18.7 || data-sort-value="0.54" | 540 m || multiple || 2002–2019 || 07 Nov 2019 || 83 || align=left | Disc.: NEAT || 
|- id="2002 TQ382" bgcolor=#E9E9E9
| 2 ||  || MBA-M || 17.8 || 1.2 km || multiple || 2002–2020 || 20 Jan 2020 || 52 || align=left | Disc.: NEAT || 
|- id="2002 TU382" bgcolor=#d6d6d6
| 0 ||  || MBA-O || 16.04 || 3.4 km || multiple || 2002–2021 || 16 May 2021 || 267 || align=left | Disc.: NEATAlt.: 2005 GF55, 2012 RJ39 || 
|- id="2002 TW382" bgcolor=#d6d6d6
| 0 ||  || MBA-O || 17.3 || 1.9 km || multiple || 2002–2020 || 26 Jan 2020 || 59 || align=left | Disc.: NEAT || 
|- id="2002 TB383" bgcolor=#E9E9E9
| 0 ||  || MBA-M || 17.8 || 1.2 km || multiple || 2002–2020 || 14 Feb 2020 || 117 || align=left | Disc.: NEAT || 
|- id="2002 TD383" bgcolor=#E9E9E9
| – ||  || MBA-M || 18.2 || 1.3 km || single || 34 days || 07 Nov 2002 || 8 || align=left | Disc.: SDSS || 
|- id="2002 TE383" bgcolor=#E9E9E9
| 0 ||  || MBA-M || 18.09 || 1.0 km || multiple || 2002–2021 || 16 Apr 2021 || 60 || align=left | Disc.: SDSS || 
|- id="2002 TF383" bgcolor=#fefefe
| 0 ||  || MBA-I || 18.2 || data-sort-value="0.68" | 680 m || multiple || 2002–2021 || 05 Jun 2021 || 101 || align=left | Disc.: SDSS || 
|- id="2002 TH383" bgcolor=#fefefe
| 0 ||  || MBA-I || 17.74 || data-sort-value="0.84" | 840 m || multiple || 2000–2021 || 04 Dec 2021 || 137 || align=left | Disc.: LONEOSAlt.: 2015 BZ244 || 
|- id="2002 TK383" bgcolor=#d6d6d6
| 0 ||  || MBA-O || 16.39 || 2.9 km || multiple || 2002–2021 || 13 May 2021 || 189 || align=left | Disc.: Uccle Obs.Alt.: 2013 WL3 || 
|- id="2002 TM383" bgcolor=#d6d6d6
| 0 ||  || MBA-O || 16.7 || 2.5 km || multiple || 2002–2021 || 15 May 2021 || 69 || align=left | Disc.: SDSSAlt.: 2007 RQ85 || 
|- id="2002 TQ383" bgcolor=#fefefe
| 0 ||  || MBA-I || 18.67 || data-sort-value="0.55" | 550 m || multiple || 2000–2022 || 08 Jan 2022 || 53 || align=left | Disc.: SDSSAlt.: 2006 WX20, 2015 FE223 || 
|- id="2002 TS383" bgcolor=#d6d6d6
| 1 ||  || MBA-O || 17.2 || 2.0 km || multiple || 2002–2020 || 26 Jan 2020 || 41 || align=left | Disc.: SDSS || 
|- id="2002 TY383" bgcolor=#fefefe
| 0 ||  || MBA-I || 18.1 || data-sort-value="0.71" | 710 m || multiple || 2002–2020 || 15 Dec 2020 || 98 || align=left | Disc.: LINEARAdded on 19 October 2020 || 
|- id="2002 TB384" bgcolor=#d6d6d6
| 0 ||  || MBA-O || 16.5 || 2.8 km || multiple || 2002–2019 || 20 Dec 2019 || 74 || align=left | Disc.: SDSSAlt.: 2002 UG59, 2011 FV83, 2016 EX49 || 
|- id="2002 TL384" bgcolor=#FA8072
| 0 ||  || MCA || 16.9 || 1.2 km || multiple || 1998–2019 || 14 Nov 2019 || 102 || align=left | Disc.: NEAT || 
|- id="2002 TR384" bgcolor=#E9E9E9
| 0 ||  || MBA-M || 17.7 || 1.6 km || multiple || 2002–2020 || 17 Sep 2020 || 33 || align=left | Disc.: SDSS || 
|- id="2002 TS384" bgcolor=#fefefe
| 0 ||  || MBA-I || 18.6 || data-sort-value="0.57" | 570 m || multiple || 2002–2021 || 14 Jan 2021 || 51 || align=left | Disc.: SDSS || 
|- id="2002 TU384" bgcolor=#d6d6d6
| 2 ||  || MBA-O || 17.86 || 1.5 km || multiple || 2002-2022 || 22 Sep 2022 || 41 || align=left | Disc.: SDSS || 
|- id="2002 TV384" bgcolor=#E9E9E9
| 0 ||  || MBA-M || 17.7 || 1.2 km || multiple || 2002–2019 || 27 Oct 2019 || 50 || align=left | Disc.: SDSS || 
|- id="2002 TW384" bgcolor=#E9E9E9
| 0 ||  || MBA-M || 17.50 || 1.8 km || multiple || 1999–2022 || 07 Jan 2022 || 67 || align=left | Disc.: SDSS || 
|- id="2002 TX384" bgcolor=#E9E9E9
| 0 ||  || MBA-M || 17.32 || 1.0 km || multiple || 2002–2021 || 30 Jul 2021 || 111 || align=left | Disc.: SDSS || 
|- id="2002 TY384" bgcolor=#fefefe
| 0 ||  || MBA-I || 18.49 || data-sort-value="0.60" | 600 m || multiple || 2001–2021 || 25 Nov 2021 || 92 || align=left | Disc.: SDSS || 
|- id="2002 TA385" bgcolor=#E9E9E9
| 0 ||  || MBA-M || 17.4 || 1.8 km || multiple || 2002–2020 || 16 Oct 2020 || 94 || align=left | Disc.: SDSS || 
|- id="2002 TD385" bgcolor=#E9E9E9
| 0 ||  || MBA-M || 17.4 || 1.8 km || multiple || 2002–2020 || 06 Dec 2020 || 89 || align=left | Disc.: SDSSAlt.: 2011 UB371 || 
|- id="2002 TJ385" bgcolor=#d6d6d6
| 0 ||  || MBA-O || 16.34 || 3.0 km || multiple || 1997–2021 || 11 Jun 2021 || 157 || align=left | Disc.: SDSS || 
|- id="2002 TM385" bgcolor=#E9E9E9
| 0 ||  || MBA-M || 17.4 || 1.4 km || multiple || 2002–2020 || 19 Jan 2020 || 119 || align=left | Disc.: NEATAlt.: 2015 YD5 || 
|- id="2002 TP385" bgcolor=#fefefe
| 0 ||  || MBA-I || 18.3 || data-sort-value="0.65" | 650 m || multiple || 2002–2019 || 29 Jul 2019 || 81 || align=left | Disc.: NEATAlt.: 2009 WT66 || 
|- id="2002 TQ385" bgcolor=#d6d6d6
| 0 ||  || MBA-O || 16.8 || 2.4 km || multiple || 2002–2019 || 28 Nov 2019 || 53 || align=left | Disc.: NEAT || 
|- id="2002 TW385" bgcolor=#fefefe
| 0 ||  || MBA-I || 19.25 || data-sort-value="0.42" | 420 m || multiple || 2002–2021 || 06 Oct 2021 || 45 || align=left | Disc.: NEATAdded on 5 November 2021 || 
|- id="2002 TD386" bgcolor=#E9E9E9
| 0 ||  || MBA-M || 18.2 || data-sort-value="0.68" | 680 m || multiple || 2002–2016 || 10 Feb 2016 || 47 || align=left | Disc.: NEATAlt.: 2014 ON362 || 
|- id="2002 TH386" bgcolor=#E9E9E9
| 0 ||  || MBA-M || 18.0 || 1.1 km || multiple || 2002–2021 || 08 Jan 2021 || 65 || align=left | Disc.: NEATAlt.: 2011 UZ182, 2015 TC282 || 
|- id="2002 TM386" bgcolor=#d6d6d6
| 0 ||  || MBA-O || 17.34 || 1.9 km || multiple || 2002–2021 || 07 Nov 2021 || 88 || align=left | Disc.: NEATAlt.: 2016 QU52 || 
|- id="2002 TN386" bgcolor=#E9E9E9
| 0 ||  || MBA-M || 17.6 || 1.7 km || multiple || 2002–2020 || 15 Dec 2020 || 56 || align=left | Disc.: NEAT || 
|- id="2002 TO386" bgcolor=#E9E9E9
| 0 ||  || MBA-M || 17.1 || 2.1 km || multiple || 2001–2021 || 06 Jan 2021 || 142 || align=left | Disc.: NEATAlt.: 2011 SD224 || 
|- id="2002 TR386" bgcolor=#E9E9E9
| 2 ||  || MBA-M || 18.1 || 1.0 km || multiple || 2002–2020 || 14 Dec 2020 || 43 || align=left | Disc.: NEATAlt.: 2015 RQ10 || 
|- id="2002 TS386" bgcolor=#d6d6d6
| 2 ||  || MBA-O || 17.6 || 1.7 km || multiple || 2002–2018 || 30 Sep 2018 || 39 || align=left | Disc.: NEAT || 
|- id="2002 TU386" bgcolor=#d6d6d6
| 0 ||  || MBA-O || 16.6 || 2.7 km || multiple || 2002–2020 || 02 Feb 2020 || 91 || align=left | Disc.: NEAT || 
|- id="2002 TV386" bgcolor=#d6d6d6
| 0 ||  || MBA-O || 16.4 || 2.9 km || multiple || 2002–2020 || 15 Feb 2020 || 148 || align=left | Disc.: NEAT || 
|- id="2002 TX386" bgcolor=#fefefe
| 0 ||  || HUN || 18.81 || data-sort-value="0.51" | 510 m || multiple || 2002–2021 || 26 Sep 2021 || 65 || align=left | Disc.: AMOSAlt.: 2013 SA56 || 
|- id="2002 TY386" bgcolor=#d6d6d6
| 0 ||  || MBA-O || 16.7 || 2.5 km || multiple || 2002–2017 || 08 Oct 2017 || 70 || align=left | Disc.: NEATAlt.: 2008 YH102 || 
|- id="2002 TD387" bgcolor=#fefefe
| 2 ||  || MBA-I || 18.6 || data-sort-value="0.57" | 570 m || multiple || 2002–2018 || 07 Mar 2018 || 25 || align=left | Disc.: NEAT || 
|- id="2002 TF387" bgcolor=#fefefe
| 1 ||  || HUN || 18.1 || data-sort-value="0.71" | 710 m || multiple || 2002–2020 || 19 Dec 2020 || 110 || align=left | Disc.: NEAT || 
|- id="2002 TG387" bgcolor=#d6d6d6
| 0 ||  || MBA-O || 15.92 || 4.8 km || multiple || 2002–2021 || 19 May 2021 || 321 || align=left | Disc.: NEATAlt.: 2010 KR98 || 
|- id="2002 TK387" bgcolor=#d6d6d6
| 0 ||  || MBA-O || 17.43 || 1.8 km || multiple || 2002–2021 || 19 May 2021 || 57 || align=left | Disc.: SDSSAdded on 19 October 2020 || 
|- id="2002 TX387" bgcolor=#fefefe
| 0 ||  || MBA-I || 18.17 || data-sort-value="0.69" | 690 m || multiple || 1995–2021 || 09 Apr 2021 || 58 || align=left | Disc.: NEATAdded on 19 October 2020 || 
|- id="2002 TZ387" bgcolor=#d6d6d6
| 0 ||  || MBA-O || 16.1 || 3.4 km || multiple || 2002–2020 || 28 Apr 2020 || 77 || align=left | Disc.: Pan-STARRSAlt.: 2015 DQ132 || 
|- id="2002 TC388" bgcolor=#d6d6d6
| 0 ||  || MBA-O || 17.3 || 1.9 km || multiple || 2002–2018 || 08 Aug 2018 || 43 || align=left | Disc.: NEATAlt.: 2015 AS130 || 
|- id="2002 TD388" bgcolor=#d6d6d6
| 0 ||  || MBA-O || 17.13 || 2.1 km || multiple || 2002–2021 || 11 Jun 2021 || 68 || align=left | Disc.: SDSS || 
|- id="2002 TG388" bgcolor=#E9E9E9
| 1 ||  || MBA-M || 18.1 || 1.3 km || multiple || 2002–2021 || 14 Nov 2021 || 44 || align=left | Disc.: LPL/Spacewatch IIAdded on 29 January 2022 || 
|- id="2002 TN388" bgcolor=#E9E9E9
| 3 ||  || MBA-M || 17.2 || 1.1 km || multiple || 2002–2021 || 01 Jul 2021 || 27 || align=left | Disc.: NEAT || 
|- id="2002 TP388" bgcolor=#d6d6d6
| 0 ||  || MBA-O || 16.24 || 3.1 km || multiple || 2002–2021 || 08 Sep 2021 || 101 || align=left | Disc.: NEATAlt.: 2010 BC26 || 
|- id="2002 TR388" bgcolor=#fefefe
| 0 ||  || MBA-I || 18.2 || data-sort-value="0.68" | 680 m || multiple || 2002–2021 || 17 Jan 2021 || 70 || align=left | Disc.: NEAT || 
|- id="2002 TS388" bgcolor=#E9E9E9
| – ||  || MBA-M || 17.2 || 1.5 km || single || 27 days || 06 Nov 2002 || 9 || align=left | Disc.: NEAT || 
|- id="2002 TT388" bgcolor=#d6d6d6
| 0 ||  || MBA-O || 17.2 || 2.0 km || multiple || 2002–2019 || 26 Feb 2019 || 87 || align=left | Disc.: NEAT || 
|- id="2002 TG389" bgcolor=#fefefe
| 0 ||  || MBA-I || 17.95 || data-sort-value="0.76" | 760 m || multiple || 2002–2021 || 30 Nov 2021 || 140 || align=left | Disc.: NEAT || 
|- id="2002 TJ389" bgcolor=#E9E9E9
| 0 ||  || MBA-M || 17.31 || 1.9 km || multiple || 2002–2022 || 25 Jan 2022 || 125 || align=left | Disc.: NEAT || 
|- id="2002 TK389" bgcolor=#fefefe
| 0 ||  || MBA-I || 17.5 || data-sort-value="0.94" | 940 m || multiple || 2002–2020 || 09 Dec 2020 || 87 || align=left | Disc.: NEAT || 
|- id="2002 TL389" bgcolor=#fefefe
| 0 ||  || MBA-I || 18.2 || data-sort-value="0.68" | 680 m || multiple || 2002–2020 || 10 Dec 2020 || 81 || align=left | Disc.: LPL/Spacewatch II || 
|- id="2002 TM389" bgcolor=#E9E9E9
| 0 ||  || MBA-M || 17.2 || 1.5 km || multiple || 2002–2021 || 18 Jan 2021 || 140 || align=left | Disc.: LPL/Spacewatch II || 
|- id="2002 TN389" bgcolor=#fefefe
| 0 ||  || MBA-I || 18.32 || data-sort-value="0.64" | 640 m || multiple || 2002–2022 || 07 Jan 2022 || 109 || align=left | Disc.: NEAT || 
|- id="2002 TO389" bgcolor=#fefefe
| 0 ||  || MBA-I || 17.4 || data-sort-value="0.98" | 980 m || multiple || 2002–2020 || 23 Dec 2020 || 124 || align=left | Disc.: NEAT || 
|- id="2002 TQ389" bgcolor=#fefefe
| 0 ||  || MBA-I || 17.5 || data-sort-value="0.94" | 940 m || multiple || 2002–2021 || 05 Jan 2021 || 136 || align=left | Disc.: NEAT || 
|- id="2002 TR389" bgcolor=#fefefe
| 0 ||  || MBA-I || 17.8 || data-sort-value="0.82" | 820 m || multiple || 1994–2020 || 17 Oct 2020 || 95 || align=left | Disc.: NEAT || 
|- id="2002 TS389" bgcolor=#fefefe
| 0 ||  || MBA-I || 18.28 || data-sort-value="0.66" | 660 m || multiple || 2002–2022 || 26 Jan 2022 || 108 || align=left | Disc.: NEAT || 
|- id="2002 TT389" bgcolor=#d6d6d6
| 0 ||  || MBA-O || 16.8 || 2.4 km || multiple || 2002–2021 || 12 Jun 2021 || 82 || align=left | Disc.: LPL/Spacewatch II || 
|- id="2002 TV389" bgcolor=#fefefe
| 0 ||  || MBA-I || 18.0 || data-sort-value="0.75" | 750 m || multiple || 2002–2020 || 16 Nov 2020 || 73 || align=left | Disc.: NEAT || 
|- id="2002 TX389" bgcolor=#d6d6d6
| 0 ||  || MBA-O || 16.8 || 2.4 km || multiple || 2002–2019 || 26 Nov 2019 || 59 || align=left | Disc.: NEAT || 
|- id="2002 TY389" bgcolor=#fefefe
| 0 ||  || MBA-I || 17.9 || data-sort-value="0.78" | 780 m || multiple || 2002–2020 || 07 Dec 2020 || 115 || align=left | Disc.: NEAT || 
|- id="2002 TZ389" bgcolor=#fefefe
| 0 ||  || MBA-I || 18.3 || data-sort-value="0.65" | 650 m || multiple || 1995–2021 || 18 Jan 2021 || 83 || align=left | Disc.: LPL/Spacewatch II || 
|- id="2002 TC390" bgcolor=#E9E9E9
| 0 ||  || MBA-M || 16.4 || 2.9 km || multiple || 2002–2020 || 16 Oct 2020 || 95 || align=left | Disc.: NEATAlt.: 2006 OR7 || 
|- id="2002 TD390" bgcolor=#E9E9E9
| 0 ||  || MBA-M || 17.6 || 1.7 km || multiple || 2002–2020 || 17 Aug 2020 || 60 || align=left | Disc.: LPL/Spacewatch II || 
|- id="2002 TF390" bgcolor=#fefefe
| 0 ||  || MBA-I || 18.1 || data-sort-value="0.71" | 710 m || multiple || 2002–2021 || 05 Jan 2021 || 118 || align=left | Disc.: NEAT || 
|- id="2002 TG390" bgcolor=#d6d6d6
| 0 ||  || MBA-O || 16.4 || 2.9 km || multiple || 2002–2021 || 18 Jan 2021 || 97 || align=left | Disc.: LPL/Spacewatch II || 
|- id="2002 TH390" bgcolor=#d6d6d6
| 0 ||  || MBA-O || 16.89 || 2.3 km || multiple || 2002–2021 || 12 May 2021 || 110 || align=left | Disc.: LPL/Spacewatch II || 
|- id="2002 TJ390" bgcolor=#fefefe
| 0 ||  || MBA-I || 18.62 || data-sort-value="0.56" | 560 m || multiple || 2002–2021 || 30 Nov 2021 || 55 || align=left | Disc.: NEAT || 
|- id="2002 TK390" bgcolor=#fefefe
| 0 ||  || MBA-I || 18.0 || data-sort-value="0.75" | 750 m || multiple || 2002–2021 || 05 Jan 2021 || 71 || align=left | Disc.: LONEOS || 
|- id="2002 TN390" bgcolor=#fefefe
| 0 ||  || MBA-I || 18.4 || data-sort-value="0.62" | 620 m || multiple || 1995–2020 || 06 Dec 2020 || 61 || align=left | Disc.: Apache Point || 
|- id="2002 TP390" bgcolor=#E9E9E9
| 0 ||  || MBA-M || 17.2 || 1.5 km || multiple || 2002–2019 || 05 Jul 2019 || 52 || align=left | Disc.: NEAT || 
|- id="2002 TQ390" bgcolor=#fefefe
| 0 ||  || HUN || 18.2 || data-sort-value="0.68" | 680 m || multiple || 2002–2018 || 10 Jul 2018 || 42 || align=left | Disc.: NEAT || 
|- id="2002 TR390" bgcolor=#d6d6d6
| 0 ||  || MBA-O || 15.7 || 4.0 km || multiple || 2002–2021 || 17 Jan 2021 || 124 || align=left | Disc.: NEATAlt.: 2010 HC130 || 
|- id="2002 TS390" bgcolor=#E9E9E9
| 0 ||  || MBA-M || 17.44 || data-sort-value="0.97" | 970 m || multiple || 2002–2021 || 11 Apr 2021 || 61 || align=left | Disc.: NEAT || 
|- id="2002 TT390" bgcolor=#fefefe
| 0 ||  || MBA-I || 18.39 || data-sort-value="0.62" | 620 m || multiple || 2002–2021 || 13 Apr 2021 || 95 || align=left | Disc.: NEAT || 
|- id="2002 TU390" bgcolor=#E9E9E9
| 0 ||  || MBA-M || 17.5 || 1.3 km || multiple || 2002–2021 || 13 Jan 2021 || 93 || align=left | Disc.: NEAT || 
|- id="2002 TV390" bgcolor=#fefefe
| 1 ||  || MBA-I || 17.7 || data-sort-value="0.86" | 860 m || multiple || 2002–2021 || 18 Jan 2021 || 67 || align=left | Disc.: NEATAlt.: 2009 SZ360 || 
|- id="2002 TW390" bgcolor=#d6d6d6
| 0 ||  || MBA-O || 16.9 || 2.3 km || multiple || 2002–2018 || 08 Aug 2018 || 46 || align=left | Disc.: LPL/Spacewatch II || 
|- id="2002 TX390" bgcolor=#d6d6d6
| 0 ||  || MBA-O || 16.21 || 3.2 km || multiple || 2002–2021 || 09 Nov 2021 || 85 || align=left | Disc.: LPL/Spacewatch IIAlt.: 2010 CH240 || 
|- id="2002 TY390" bgcolor=#fefefe
| 0 ||  || MBA-I || 18.0 || data-sort-value="0.75" | 750 m || multiple || 2002–2017 || 21 Feb 2017 || 42 || align=left | Disc.: LONEOS || 
|- id="2002 TZ390" bgcolor=#d6d6d6
| 0 ||  || MBA-O || 16.6 || 2.7 km || multiple || 2002–2020 || 17 May 2020 || 70 || align=left | Disc.: LPL/Spacewatch II || 
|- id="2002 TA391" bgcolor=#fefefe
| 0 ||  || MBA-I || 17.9 || data-sort-value="0.78" | 780 m || multiple || 2002–2020 || 07 Oct 2020 || 94 || align=left | Disc.: NEAT || 
|- id="2002 TB391" bgcolor=#fefefe
| 0 ||  || MBA-I || 18.1 || data-sort-value="0.71" | 710 m || multiple || 2002–2020 || 10 Dec 2020 || 180 || align=left | Disc.: NEAT || 
|- id="2002 TC391" bgcolor=#E9E9E9
| 0 ||  || MBA-M || 17.6 || 1.3 km || multiple || 2002–2019 || 28 Nov 2019 || 62 || align=left | Disc.: NEATAlt.: 2019 PA19 || 
|- id="2002 TD391" bgcolor=#fefefe
| 0 ||  || MBA-I || 18.8 || data-sort-value="0.52" | 520 m || multiple || 1995–2020 || 08 Dec 2020 || 60 || align=left | Disc.: NEAT || 
|- id="2002 TE391" bgcolor=#fefefe
| 0 ||  || MBA-I || 18.45 || data-sort-value="0.61" | 610 m || multiple || 2002–2021 || 05 Jul 2021 || 66 || align=left | Disc.: LONEOS || 
|- id="2002 TF391" bgcolor=#d6d6d6
| 0 ||  || MBA-O || 16.2 || 3.2 km || multiple || 2002–2021 || 02 Jan 2021 || 91 || align=left | Disc.: NEAT || 
|- id="2002 TG391" bgcolor=#d6d6d6
| 0 ||  || MBA-O || 16.7 || 2.5 km || multiple || 2002–2019 || 25 Sep 2019 || 59 || align=left | Disc.: LPL/Spacewatch II || 
|- id="2002 TH391" bgcolor=#d6d6d6
| 0 ||  || MBA-O || 16.5 || 2.8 km || multiple || 2002–2021 || 23 Jan 2021 || 147 || align=left | Disc.: CINEOS || 
|- id="2002 TJ391" bgcolor=#E9E9E9
| 0 ||  || MBA-M || 16.81 || 1.3 km || multiple || 2002–2021 || 11 May 2021 || 69 || align=left | Disc.: NEATAlt.: 2010 KZ34 || 
|- id="2002 TK391" bgcolor=#E9E9E9
| 0 ||  || MBA-M || 16.83 || 1.8 km || multiple || 2002–2021 || 08 May 2021 || 165 || align=left | Disc.: NEAT || 
|- id="2002 TM391" bgcolor=#E9E9E9
| 0 ||  || MBA-M || 17.59 || 1.3 km || multiple || 2002–2022 || 26 Jan 2022 || 86 || align=left | Disc.: LPL/Spacewatch II || 
|- id="2002 TN391" bgcolor=#fefefe
| 0 ||  || MBA-I || 18.3 || data-sort-value="0.65" | 650 m || multiple || 2002–2020 || 17 Nov 2020 || 93 || align=left | Disc.: NEAT || 
|- id="2002 TO391" bgcolor=#d6d6d6
| 0 ||  || MBA-O || 16.2 || 3.2 km || multiple || 2002–2021 || 17 Jan 2021 || 57 || align=left | Disc.: NEAT || 
|- id="2002 TP391" bgcolor=#FA8072
| 0 ||  || MCA || 19.09 || data-sort-value="0.45" | 450 m || multiple || 2002–2022 || 05 Jan 2022 || 98 || align=left | Disc.: NEAT || 
|- id="2002 TQ391" bgcolor=#fefefe
| 0 ||  || MBA-I || 17.5 || data-sort-value="0.94" | 940 m || multiple || 2002–2021 || 09 Jun 2021 || 136 || align=left | Disc.: LPL/Spacewatch II || 
|- id="2002 TR391" bgcolor=#d6d6d6
| 0 ||  || MBA-O || 16.75 || 2.5 km || multiple || 2002–2019 || 20 Dec 2019 || 102 || align=left | Disc.: NEAT || 
|- id="2002 TS391" bgcolor=#E9E9E9
| 0 ||  || MBA-M || 17.9 || 1.1 km || multiple || 2002–2020 || 19 Jan 2020 || 96 || align=left | Disc.: LPL/Spacewatch II || 
|- id="2002 TT391" bgcolor=#E9E9E9
| 0 ||  || MBA-M || 17.0 || 1.7 km || multiple || 2002–2020 || 26 Jan 2020 || 112 || align=left | Disc.: NEAT || 
|- id="2002 TX391" bgcolor=#d6d6d6
| 0 ||  || MBA-O || 16.08 || 3.4 km || multiple || 2002–2021 || 08 May 2021 || 154 || align=left | Disc.: NEAT || 
|- id="2002 TY391" bgcolor=#E9E9E9
| 0 ||  || MBA-M || 17.6 || 1.3 km || multiple || 2002–2021 || 18 Jan 2021 || 165 || align=left | Disc.: NEAT || 
|- id="2002 TZ391" bgcolor=#fefefe
| 0 ||  || MBA-I || 18.0 || data-sort-value="0.75" | 750 m || multiple || 1992–2019 || 28 Nov 2019 || 73 || align=left | Disc.: NEAT || 
|- id="2002 TA392" bgcolor=#fefefe
| 1 ||  || MBA-I || 18.7 || data-sort-value="0.54" | 540 m || multiple || 2002–2019 || 28 Oct 2019 || 65 || align=left | Disc.: NEAT || 
|- id="2002 TB392" bgcolor=#E9E9E9
| 0 ||  || MBA-M || 17.64 || 1.2 km || multiple || 2002–2021 || 06 Apr 2021 || 80 || align=left | Disc.: NEAT || 
|- id="2002 TC392" bgcolor=#E9E9E9
| 0 ||  || MBA-M || 17.6 || 1.3 km || multiple || 2002–2021 || 12 Jan 2021 || 62 || align=left | Disc.: LPL/Spacewatch II || 
|- id="2002 TE392" bgcolor=#E9E9E9
| 0 ||  || MBA-M || 18.1 || 1.0 km || multiple || 2002–2019 || 28 Nov 2019 || 57 || align=left | Disc.: LPL/Spacewatch II || 
|- id="2002 TF392" bgcolor=#E9E9E9
| 0 ||  || MBA-M || 17.75 || data-sort-value="0.84" | 840 m || multiple || 2002–2021 || 16 Apr 2021 || 79 || align=left | Disc.: LPL/Spacewatch II || 
|- id="2002 TG392" bgcolor=#E9E9E9
| 0 ||  || MBA-M || 17.5 || 1.3 km || multiple || 2002–2020 || 24 Jan 2020 || 78 || align=left | Disc.: NEAT || 
|- id="2002 TH392" bgcolor=#fefefe
| 0 ||  || MBA-I || 18.8 || data-sort-value="0.52" | 520 m || multiple || 1995–2019 || 02 Nov 2019 || 62 || align=left | Disc.: NEAT || 
|- id="2002 TJ392" bgcolor=#d6d6d6
| 0 ||  || MBA-O || 17.17 || 2.0 km || multiple || 2002–2021 || 13 May 2021 || 63 || align=left | Disc.: LPL/Spacewatch II || 
|- id="2002 TK392" bgcolor=#E9E9E9
| 1 ||  || MBA-M || 17.6 || 1.3 km || multiple || 2002–2019 || 20 Dec 2019 || 62 || align=left | Disc.: NEAT || 
|- id="2002 TL392" bgcolor=#E9E9E9
| 0 ||  || MBA-M || 17.7 || 1.2 km || multiple || 2002–2019 || 28 Nov 2019 || 52 || align=left | Disc.: LPL/Spacewatch II || 
|- id="2002 TM392" bgcolor=#fefefe
| 0 ||  || MBA-I || 18.8 || data-sort-value="0.52" | 520 m || multiple || 2001–2020 || 22 Jan 2020 || 55 || align=left | Disc.: NEAT || 
|- id="2002 TN392" bgcolor=#fefefe
| 2 ||  || MBA-I || 19.0 || data-sort-value="0.47" | 470 m || multiple || 2002–2019 || 03 Dec 2019 || 49 || align=left | Disc.: LPL/Spacewatch II || 
|- id="2002 TO392" bgcolor=#E9E9E9
| 0 ||  || MBA-M || 17.8 || 1.2 km || multiple || 2002–2019 || 25 Nov 2019 || 49 || align=left | Disc.: NEAT || 
|- id="2002 TP392" bgcolor=#E9E9E9
| 0 ||  || MBA-M || 17.8 || data-sort-value="0.82" | 820 m || multiple || 2002–2019 || 04 Dec 2019 || 53 || align=left | Disc.: NEAT || 
|- id="2002 TQ392" bgcolor=#fefefe
| 1 ||  || MBA-I || 18.3 || data-sort-value="0.65" | 650 m || multiple || 2002–2019 || 31 Dec 2019 || 53 || align=left | Disc.: LPL/Spacewatch II || 
|- id="2002 TR392" bgcolor=#d6d6d6
| 0 ||  || MBA-O || 17.3 || 1.9 km || multiple || 2002–2019 || 23 Oct 2019 || 50 || align=left | Disc.: LPL/Spacewatch IIAlt.: 2008 UN399 || 
|- id="2002 TS392" bgcolor=#d6d6d6
| 0 ||  || MBA-O || 17.0 || 2.2 km || multiple || 2002–2018 || 30 Sep 2018 || 47 || align=left | Disc.: NEAT || 
|- id="2002 TT392" bgcolor=#d6d6d6
| 0 ||  || MBA-O || 17.01 || 2.2 km || multiple || 2002–2021 || 31 May 2021 || 99 || align=left | Disc.: LPL/Spacewatch II || 
|- id="2002 TU392" bgcolor=#fefefe
| 0 ||  || MBA-I || 18.81 || data-sort-value="0.51" | 510 m || multiple || 2002–2021 || 11 Oct 2021 || 89 || align=left | Disc.: LPL/Spacewatch II || 
|- id="2002 TV392" bgcolor=#E9E9E9
| 0 ||  || MBA-M || 17.68 || data-sort-value="0.87" | 870 m || multiple || 2002–2021 || 02 Apr 2021 || 72 || align=left | Disc.: LPL/Spacewatch II || 
|- id="2002 TW392" bgcolor=#E9E9E9
| 1 ||  || MBA-M || 17.7 || 1.2 km || multiple || 2002–2019 || 29 Oct 2019 || 48 || align=left | Disc.: LPL/Spacewatch IIAlt.: 2010 HN41 || 
|- id="2002 TX392" bgcolor=#fefefe
| 0 ||  || MBA-I || 18.62 || data-sort-value="0.56" | 560 m || multiple || 2002–2021 || 09 Jul 2021 || 60 || align=left | Disc.: NEAT || 
|- id="2002 TY392" bgcolor=#E9E9E9
| 0 ||  || MBA-M || 17.63 || data-sort-value="0.89" | 890 m || multiple || 2002–2021 || 03 Apr 2021 || 65 || align=left | Disc.: NEAT || 
|- id="2002 TZ392" bgcolor=#fefefe
| 0 ||  || MBA-I || 18.91 || data-sort-value="0.49" | 490 m || multiple || 2002–2021 || 05 Nov 2021 || 117 || align=left | Disc.: NEAT || 
|- id="2002 TA393" bgcolor=#E9E9E9
| 0 ||  || MBA-M || 17.0 || 1.2 km || multiple || 2002–2020 || 24 Jan 2020 || 64 || align=left | Disc.: NEAT || 
|- id="2002 TB393" bgcolor=#fefefe
| 0 ||  || MBA-I || 18.83 || data-sort-value="0.51" | 510 m || multiple || 2002–2021 || 14 Apr 2021 || 60 || align=left | Disc.: NEAT || 
|- id="2002 TC393" bgcolor=#d6d6d6
| 0 ||  || MBA-O || 17.2 || 2.0 km || multiple || 2002–2018 || 01 Oct 2018 || 38 || align=left | Disc.: LPL/Spacewatch II || 
|- id="2002 TE393" bgcolor=#fefefe
| 0 ||  || MBA-I || 17.73 || data-sort-value="0.85" | 850 m || multiple || 2002–2021 || 12 Aug 2021 || 65 || align=left | Disc.: NEAT || 
|- id="2002 TF393" bgcolor=#fefefe
| 1 ||  || MBA-I || 19.1 || data-sort-value="0.45" | 450 m || multiple || 2002–2018 || 13 Aug 2018 || 36 || align=left | Disc.: LPL/Spacewatch II || 
|- id="2002 TG393" bgcolor=#d6d6d6
| 0 ||  || MBA-O || 16.87 || 2.4 km || multiple || 1995–2021 || 07 Apr 2021 || 73 || align=left | Disc.: NEAT || 
|- id="2002 TH393" bgcolor=#E9E9E9
| 0 ||  || MBA-M || 17.3 || 1.5 km || multiple || 2002–2020 || 23 Dec 2020 || 69 || align=left | Disc.: NEAT || 
|- id="2002 TJ393" bgcolor=#d6d6d6
| 0 ||  || MBA-O || 16.7 || 2.5 km || multiple || 2002–2020 || 20 Dec 2020 || 66 || align=left | Disc.: LPL/Spacewatch II || 
|- id="2002 TK393" bgcolor=#fefefe
| 0 ||  || MBA-I || 18.3 || data-sort-value="0.65" | 650 m || multiple || 1995–2021 || 17 Jan 2021 || 63 || align=left | Disc.: LPL/Spacewatch II || 
|- id="2002 TL393" bgcolor=#E9E9E9
| 0 ||  || MBA-M || 17.8 || 1.2 km || multiple || 2002–2019 || 25 Sep 2019 || 42 || align=left | Disc.: LPL/Spacewatch II || 
|- id="2002 TN393" bgcolor=#fefefe
| 0 ||  || MBA-I || 18.67 || data-sort-value="0.55" | 550 m || multiple || 2002–2021 || 19 May 2021 || 38 || align=left | Disc.: NEAT || 
|- id="2002 TO393" bgcolor=#E9E9E9
| 0 ||  || MBA-M || 18.6 || data-sort-value="0.80" | 800 m || multiple || 2002–2019 || 25 Oct 2019 || 34 || align=left | Disc.: LPL/Spacewatch II || 
|- id="2002 TP393" bgcolor=#E9E9E9
| 0 ||  || MBA-M || 17.7 || 1.6 km || multiple || 2002–2020 || 17 Nov 2020 || 98 || align=left | Disc.: NEAT || 
|- id="2002 TQ393" bgcolor=#d6d6d6
| 1 ||  || HIL || 16.5 || 2.8 km || multiple || 2002–2018 || 16 Oct 2018 || 26 || align=left | Disc.: LPL/Spacewatch II || 
|- id="2002 TR393" bgcolor=#E9E9E9
| 0 ||  || MBA-M || 17.8 || 1.2 km || multiple || 2002–2019 || 26 Sep 2019 || 136 || align=left | Disc.: LPL/Spacewatch II || 
|- id="2002 TS393" bgcolor=#E9E9E9
| 1 ||  || MBA-M || 17.7 || 1.2 km || multiple || 2002–2020 || 22 Jan 2020 || 66 || align=left | Disc.: NEAT || 
|- id="2002 TT393" bgcolor=#E9E9E9
| 0 ||  || MBA-M || 17.05 || 1.2 km || multiple || 2002–2021 || 02 Apr 2021 || 60 || align=left | Disc.: NEAT || 
|- id="2002 TU393" bgcolor=#d6d6d6
| 0 ||  || MBA-O || 17.0 || 2.2 km || multiple || 2002–2021 || 18 Jan 2021 || 62 || align=left | Disc.: LPL/Spacewatch II || 
|- id="2002 TV393" bgcolor=#E9E9E9
| 0 ||  || MBA-M || 18.1 || data-sort-value="0.71" | 710 m || multiple || 2002–2019 || 04 Dec 2019 || 45 || align=left | Disc.: NEAT || 
|- id="2002 TW393" bgcolor=#E9E9E9
| 1 ||  || MBA-M || 17.9 || 1.1 km || multiple || 2002–2021 || 18 Jan 2021 || 45 || align=left | Disc.: LPL/Spacewatch II || 
|- id="2002 TX393" bgcolor=#E9E9E9
| 0 ||  || MBA-M || 17.8 || data-sort-value="0.82" | 820 m || multiple || 2002–2019 || 24 Dec 2019 || 45 || align=left | Disc.: NEAT || 
|- id="2002 TY393" bgcolor=#E9E9E9
| 0 ||  || MBA-M || 17.94 || 1.4 km || multiple || 2002–2021 || 11 Nov 2021 || 46 || align=left | Disc.: LPL/Spacewatch II || 
|- id="2002 TZ393" bgcolor=#fefefe
| 1 ||  || MBA-I || 18.1 || data-sort-value="0.71" | 710 m || multiple || 1995–2019 || 19 Sep 2019 || 42 || align=left | Disc.: LPL/Spacewatch II || 
|- id="2002 TA394" bgcolor=#E9E9E9
| 0 ||  || MBA-M || 17.6 || 1.3 km || multiple || 2002–2020 || 03 Jan 2020 || 32 || align=left | Disc.: NEAT || 
|- id="2002 TB394" bgcolor=#d6d6d6
| 0 ||  || MBA-O || 16.0 || 3.5 km || multiple || 2002–2021 || 17 Jan 2021 || 109 || align=left | Disc.: NEATAlt.: 2010 JG196 || 
|- id="2002 TC394" bgcolor=#fefefe
| 0 ||  || MBA-I || 18.48 || data-sort-value="0.60" | 600 m || multiple || 2002–2021 || 13 May 2021 || 91 || align=left | Disc.: LPL/Spacewatch II || 
|- id="2002 TD394" bgcolor=#E9E9E9
| 0 ||  || MBA-M || 18.0 || data-sort-value="0.75" | 750 m || multiple || 2002–2020 || 22 Mar 2020 || 60 || align=left | Disc.: NEAT || 
|- id="2002 TE394" bgcolor=#E9E9E9
| 0 ||  || MBA-M || 17.75 || data-sort-value="0.84" | 840 m || multiple || 2002–2021 || 15 Apr 2021 || 54 || align=left | Disc.: LONEOS || 
|- id="2002 TF394" bgcolor=#fefefe
| 0 ||  || HUN || 19.04 || data-sort-value="0.46" | 460 m || multiple || 1994–2021 || 10 Aug 2021 || 109 || align=left | Disc.: LPL/Spacewatch II || 
|- id="2002 TG394" bgcolor=#d6d6d6
| 2 ||  || MBA-O || 17.2 || 2.0 km || multiple || 2002–2019 || 28 Nov 2019 || 40 || align=left | Disc.: LPL/Spacewatch II || 
|- id="2002 TH394" bgcolor=#fefefe
| 1 ||  || MBA-I || 18.0 || data-sort-value="0.75" | 750 m || multiple || 2002–2020 || 16 Dec 2020 || 47 || align=left | Disc.: CINEOS || 
|- id="2002 TJ394" bgcolor=#d6d6d6
| 0 ||  || MBA-O || 17.83 || 1.5 km || multiple || 2002–2021 || 31 Aug 2021 || 63 || align=left | Disc.: LPL/Spacewatch II || 
|- id="2002 TL394" bgcolor=#E9E9E9
| 0 ||  || MBA-M || 17.8 || data-sort-value="0.82" | 820 m || multiple || 2002–2019 || 19 Nov 2019 || 40 || align=left | Disc.: LPL/Spacewatch IIAlt.: 2006 VQ185 || 
|- id="2002 TV394" bgcolor=#d6d6d6
| 1 ||  || MBA-O || 16.0 || 3.5 km || multiple || 2002–2021 || 04 May 2021 || 48 || align=left | Disc.: No observationsAdded on 11 May 2021 || 
|- id="2002 TW394" bgcolor=#fefefe
| 3 ||  || MBA-I || 18.6 || data-sort-value="0.57" | 570 m || multiple || 2002–2020 || 26 Jul 2020 || 21 || align=left | Disc.: NEATAdded on 21 August 2021 || 
|}
back to top

References 
 

Lists of unnumbered minor planets